= List of coleopterans of Sri Lanka =

Sri Lanka is a tropical island situated close to the southern tip of India. The invertebrate fauna is as large as it is common to other regions of the world. There are about 2 million species of arthropods found in the world, and more are still being discovered to this day. This makes it very complicated and difficult to summarize the exact number of species found within a certain region.

This is a list of the coleopterans found from Sri Lanka, using recent family-level classification:

== Species count ==
=== Family: Aderidae - ant-like leaf beetles ===
- Aderus concolor
- Aderus crassipes
- Aderus dikoyanus
- Aderus nigropictus
- Aderus orientalis
- Aderus scoparius
- Aderus taprobanus
- Euxylophilus principalis

=== Family: Anthicidae - Ant-like beetles ===
- Amblyderus bigibber
- Amblyderus brincki
- Amblyderus thoracinus
- Anthelephila anderssoni
- Anthelephila besucheti
- Anthelephila braminus
- Anthelephila burckhardti
- Anthelephila consul
- Anthelephila insulana
- Anthelephila opiatus
- Anthicus semirubidus
- Endomia besucheti
- Endomia castelsi
- Endomia ceylonica
- Laena formaneki
- Leptaleus brincki
- Mecynotarsus cederholmi
- Mecynotarsus flinti
- Notoxus brinckianus
- Notoxus ravana
- Phalantias besucheti
- Phalantias loebli
- Phalantias mussardi
- Phalantias praeclarus
- Pseudoleptaleus argutus
- Pseudoleptaleus baloghi
- Pseudoleptaleus basirufus
- Pseudoleptaleus yalaensis
- Pseudonotoxus cederholmi
- Pseudonotoxus ekesi
- Pseudonotoxus minutus
- Sapintus barbei
- Sapintus brincki
- Sapintus capitatus
- Sapintus flinti
- Tomoderus anderssoni
- Tomoderus discisus
- Tomoderus mussardi
- Tomoderus terrenus

=== Family: Anthribidae - Fungus weevils ===
- Acorynus ceylonicus
- Acorynus cinereomaculatus
- Acorynus cingalus
- Acorynus dohrni
- Acorynus labidus
- Acorynus passerinus
- Apolecta nietneri
- Araecerus fragilis
- Araecerus intangens
- Araecerus irresolutus
- Araecerus pardalis
- Araecerus pumilus
- Atinellia senex
- Basitropis nitidicutis
- Caccorhinus brunnipennis
- Caccorhinus disconotatus
- Contexta murina
- Dendrotrogus colligens
- Dendrotrogus hypocrita
- Directarius bifoveatus
- Disphaerona picta
- Disphaerona punctata
- Disphaerona verrucosus
- Exechesops horni
- Exechesops molitor
- Habrissus asellus
- Habrissus tibialis
- Hybosternus mesosternalis
- Hypseus dilectus
- Litocerus annulipes
- Litocerus crucicollis
- Litocerus semiustus
- Mauia subnotata
- Mecotropis bipunctatus
- Mecotropis gardneri
- Melanopsacus ceylonicus
- Misthosima separ
- Phaulimia caena
- Phaulimia disticha
- Phaulimia schaumi
- Phloeobius alternans
- Phloeobius ceylonicus
- Rhaphitropis tamilis
- Straboscopus revocans
- Straboscopus riehli
- Sympaector angulifer
- Tropideres verrucosus
- Tropidobasis gemella
- Ulorhinus distichus
- Uncifer diffinis
- Urodon maculatus
- Urodon nigripes
- Urodon tantillus
- Xenocerus khasianus
- Xenocerus mesosternalis
- Xenocerus rectilineatus
- Xylinada tamilanus
- Xylinada indigus
- Zygaenodes horni
- Zygaenodes molitor

=== Family: Attelabidae - Leaf-rolling weevils ===
- Apoderus dohrni
- Apoderus hystrix
- Apoderus nietneri
- Apoderus pulchellus
- Apoderus pullus
- Apoderus scitulus
- Apoderus tranquebaricus
- Apoderus verrucosus
- Asynaptops colombensis
- Attelabus hystrix
- Attelabus octospilotus
- Attelabus tranquebaricus
- Centrocorynus dohrni
- Centrocorynus pulchellus
- Euops metallica
- Euops nietneri
- Euops suffundens
- Henicolabus octospilotus
- Hoplapoderus echinatus
- Hoplapoderus hystrix
- Hoplapoderus nepalensis
- Mechoris ursulus
- Paracycnotrachelus nietneri
- Strigapoderus ceylonicus

=== Family: Biphyllidae - False Skin beetles ===
- Biphyllus minutus
- Diplocoelus indicus

=== Family: Bolboceratidae - Dor beetles ===
- Bolbaffroides carenicollis
- Bolboceras insulare
- Bolbochromus laetus
- Bolbochromus lineatus
- Bolbohamatum meridionale
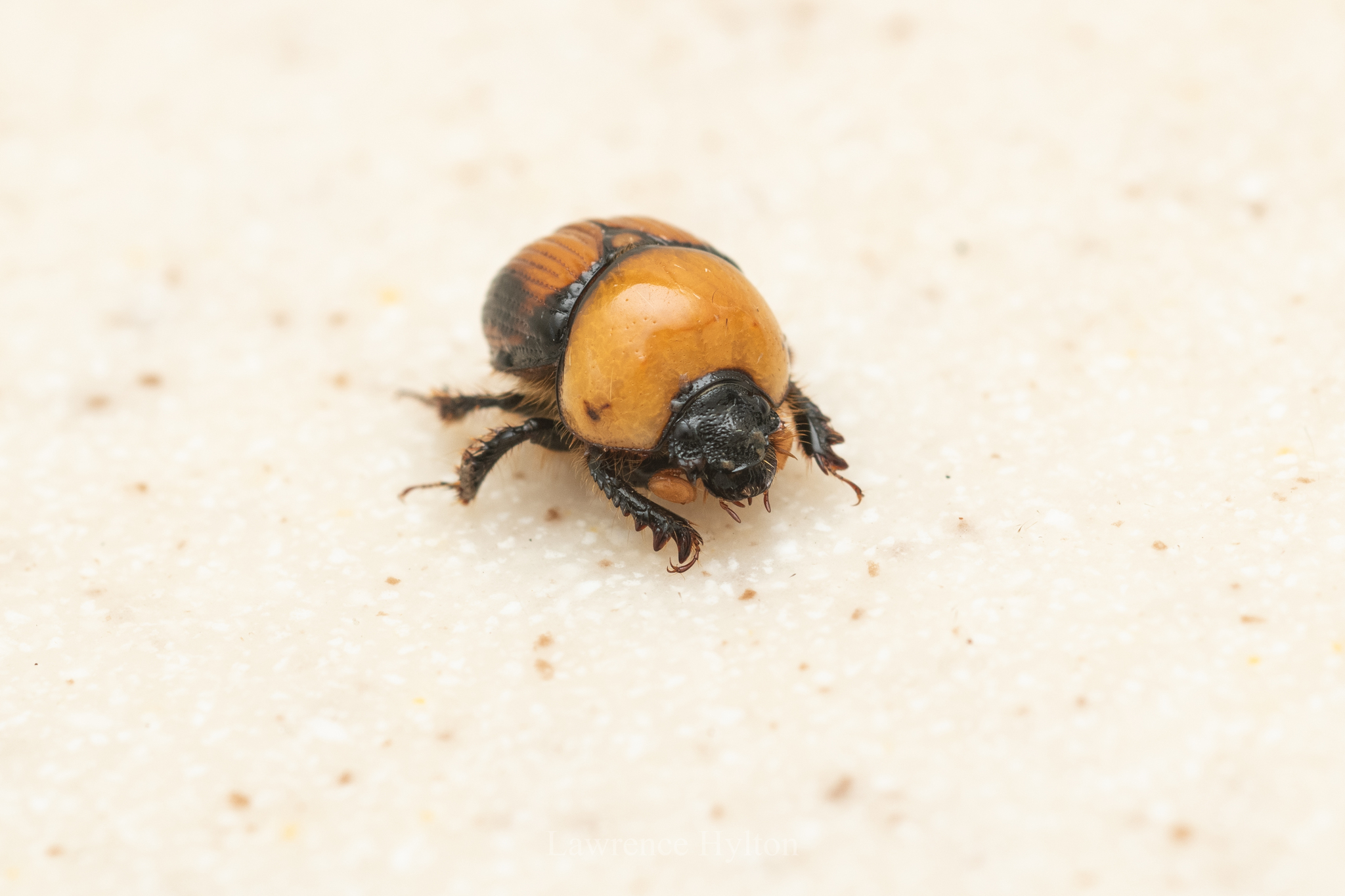
Bolbochromus laetus

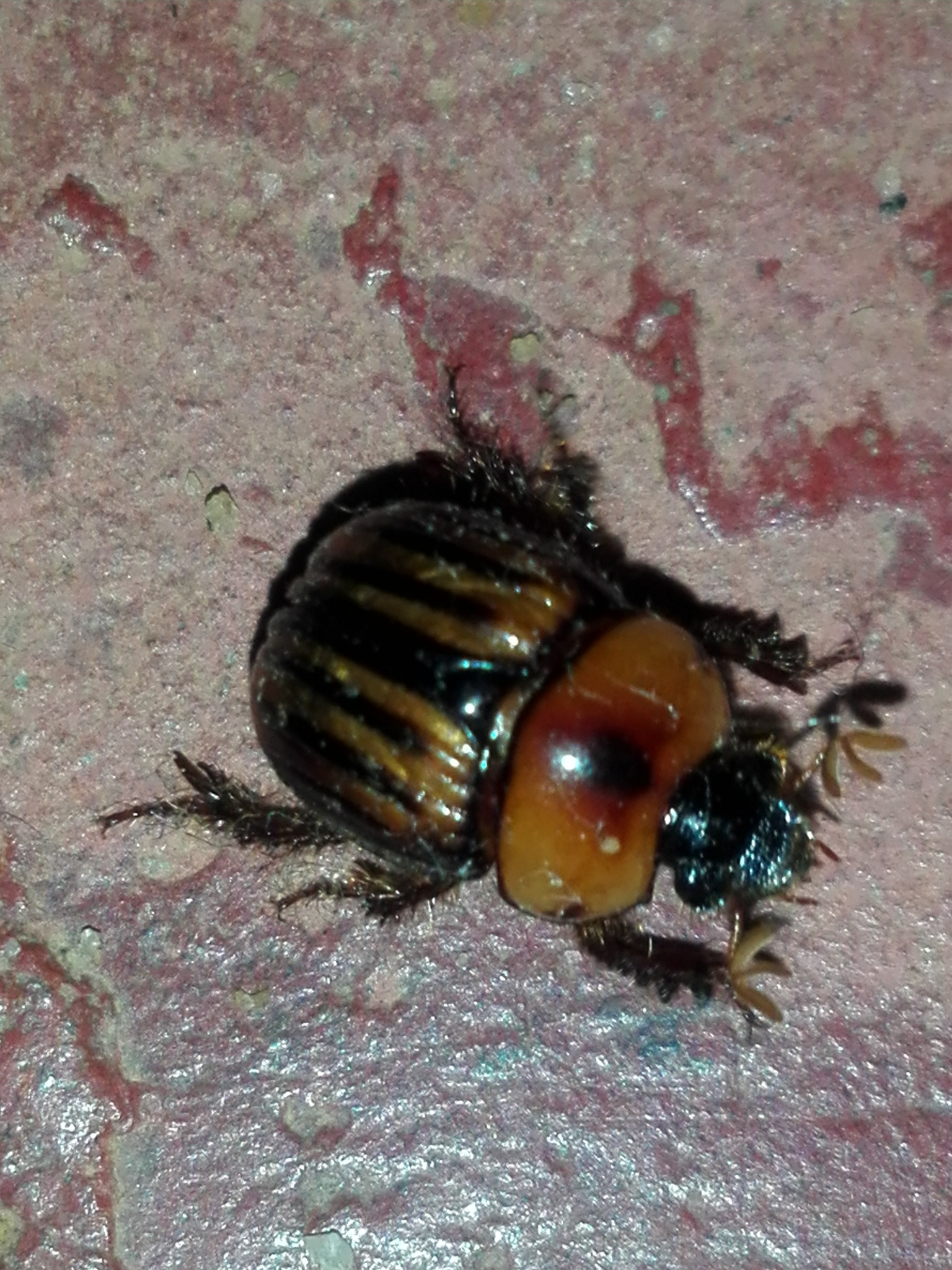
Bolbochromus lineatus

=== Family: Bostrichidae - Auger beetles ===
- Amphicerus anobioides
- Apate submedia
- Bostrichus moderatus
- Bostrichus vertens
- Dinoderus ocellaris
- Heterobostrychus aequalis
- Heterobostrychus hamatipennis
- Lichenophanes carinipennis
- Lyctus brunneus
- Lyctus discedens
- Lyctus disputans
- Lyctus retractus
- Lyctus retrahens
- Minthea rugicollis
- Paraxylion bifer
- Rhyzopertha dominica
- Rhyzopertha sicula
- Sinoxylon anale
- Sinoxylon unidentatum
- Xylocis tortilicornis
- Xylodeleis obsipa
- Xylophorus abnormis
- Xylophorus ceylonicus
- Xylopsocus capucinus
- Xylothrips flavipes
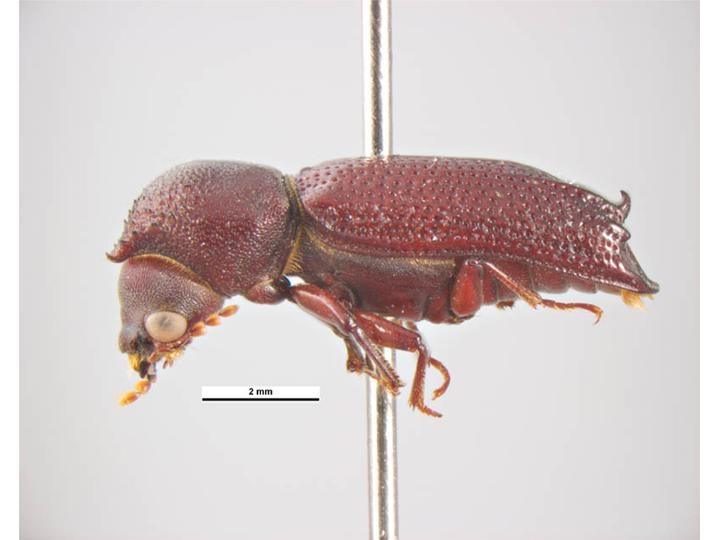
Heterobostrychus aequalis

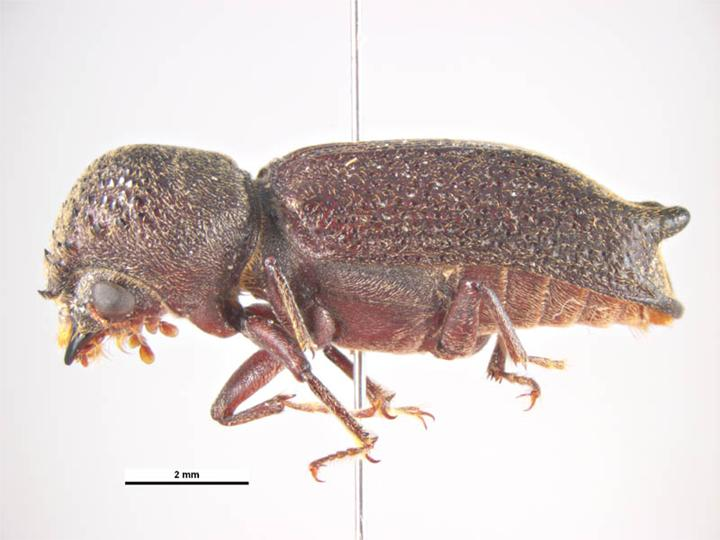
Heterobostrychus hamatipennis

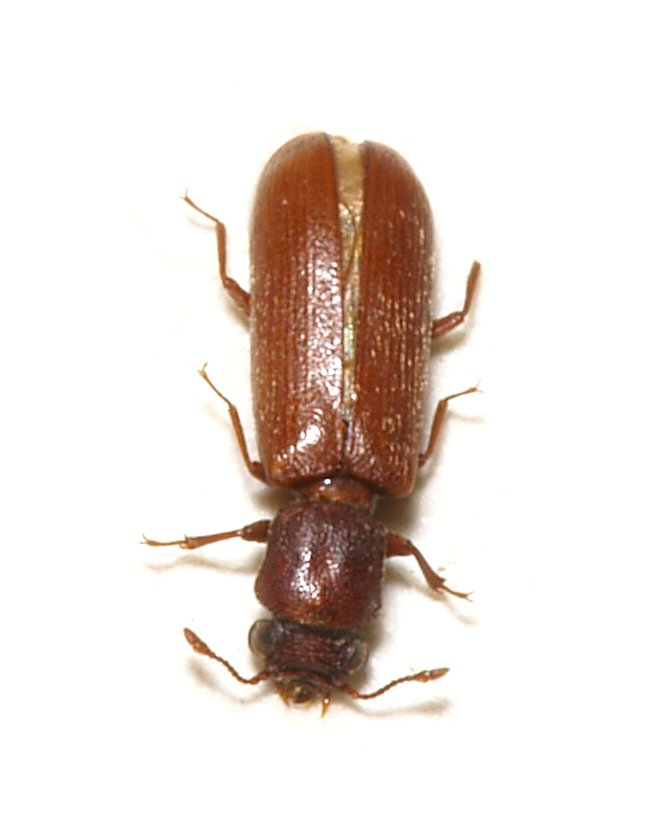
Lyctus.brunneus

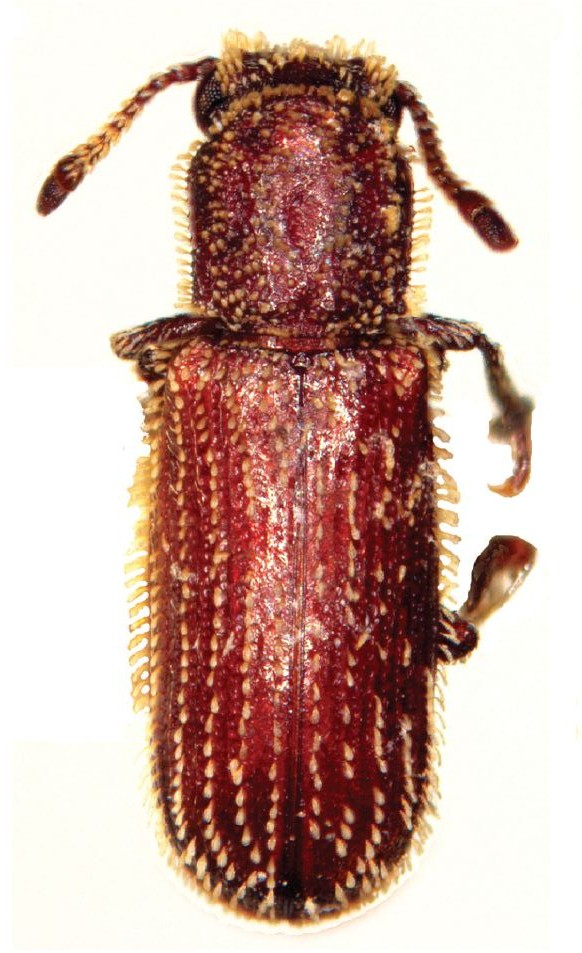
Minthea rugicollis

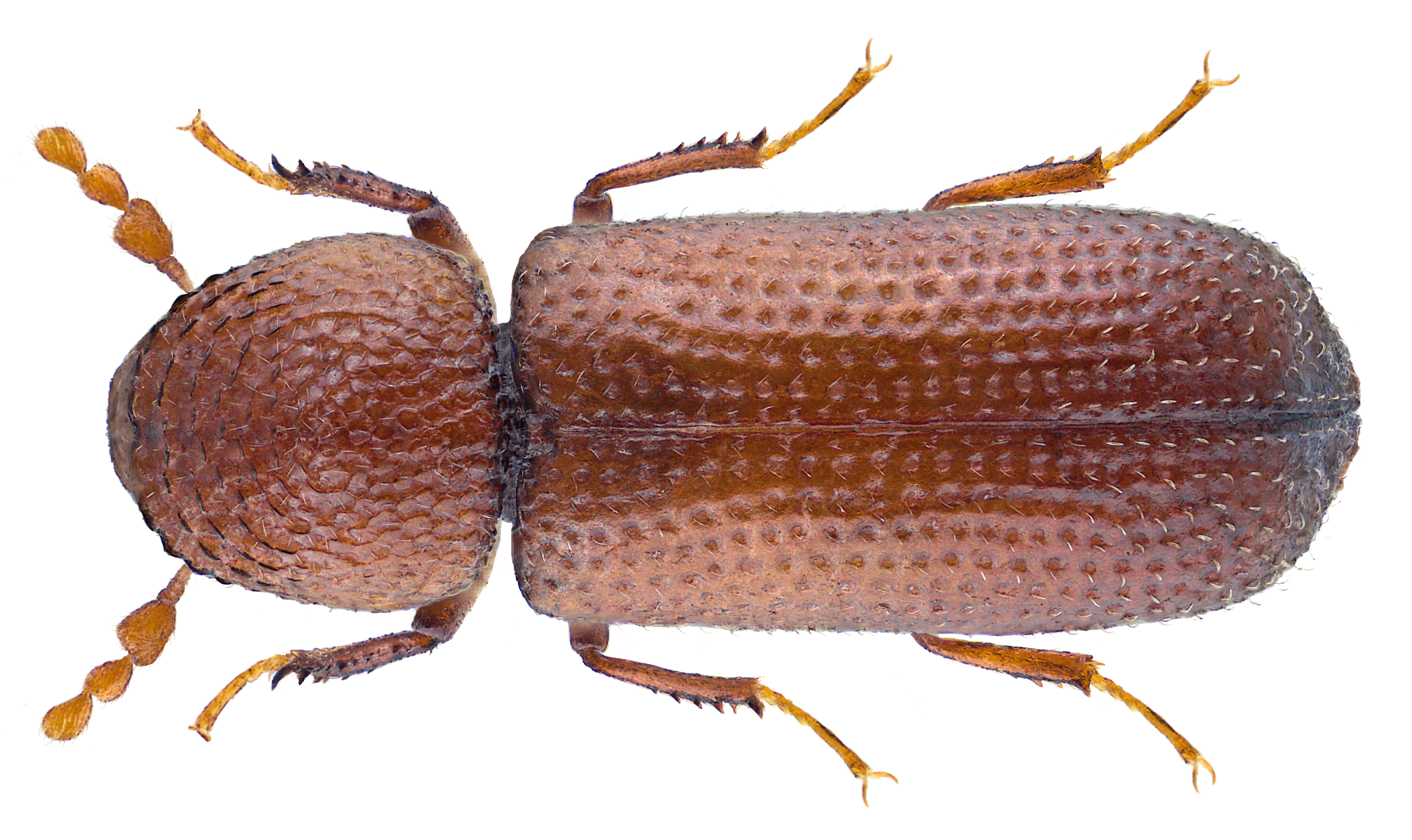
Rhizopertha dominica

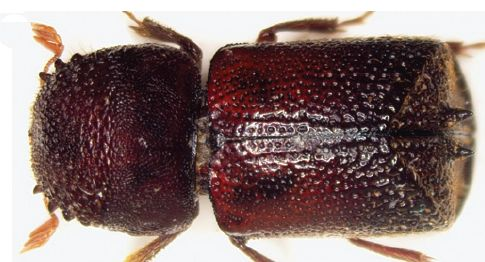
Sinoxylon anale

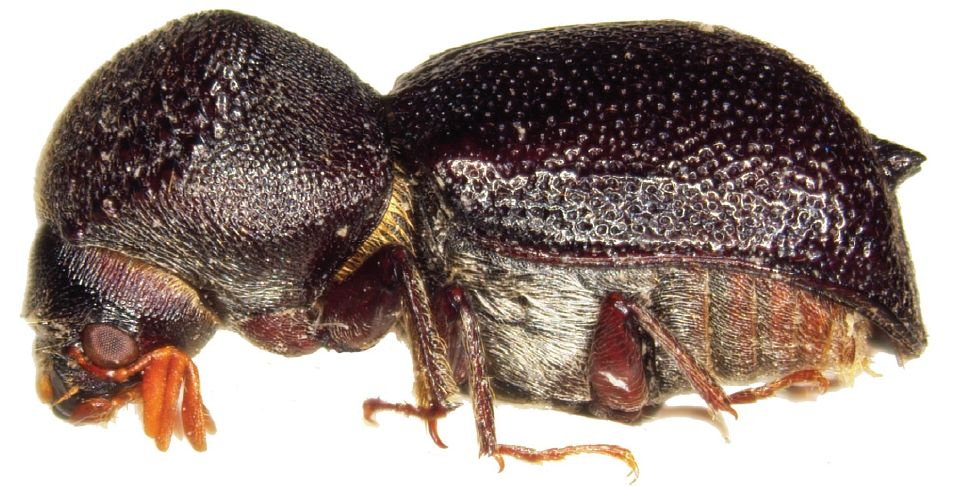
Sinoxylon unidentatum

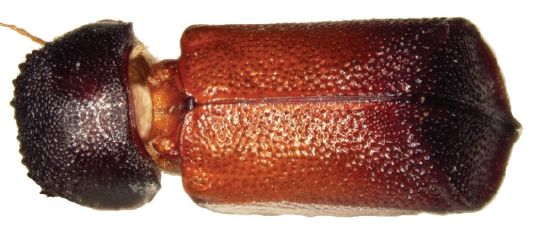
Xylopsocus capucinus

=== Family: Bothrideridae - Cocoon-forming beetles ===
- Ascetoderes bituberculatus
- Dastarcus porosus
- Leptoglyphus cristatus
- Machlotes cognatus

=== Family: Brachyceridae - Tertiary-brachycerid weevils ===
- Amblyrrhinus posticus
- Desmidophorus caelatus
- Desmidophorus communicans
- Desmidophorus discriminans
- Desmidophorus fasciculicollis
- Desmidophorus inexpertus
- Desmidophorus obliquefasciatus
- Desmidophorus strenuus
- Phytonomus ochraceus

=== Family: Brentidae - Straight-snouted weevils ===
- Cerobates sumatranus
- Cyphagogus westwoodii
- Orychodes planicollis
- Trachelizus bisulcatus

=== Family: Buprestidae - Jewel beetles ===
- Agrilus arenatus
- Agrilus imitator
- Agrilus immaculatellus
- Agrilus immaculatus
- Agrilus immaculicollis
- Agrilus impar
- Agrilus pidijinus
- Belionota aenea
- Belionota sagittaria
- Belionota sumptuosa
- Chrysochroa fasciata
- Sternocera chrysis
- Trachys elvira
- Trachys flaviceps
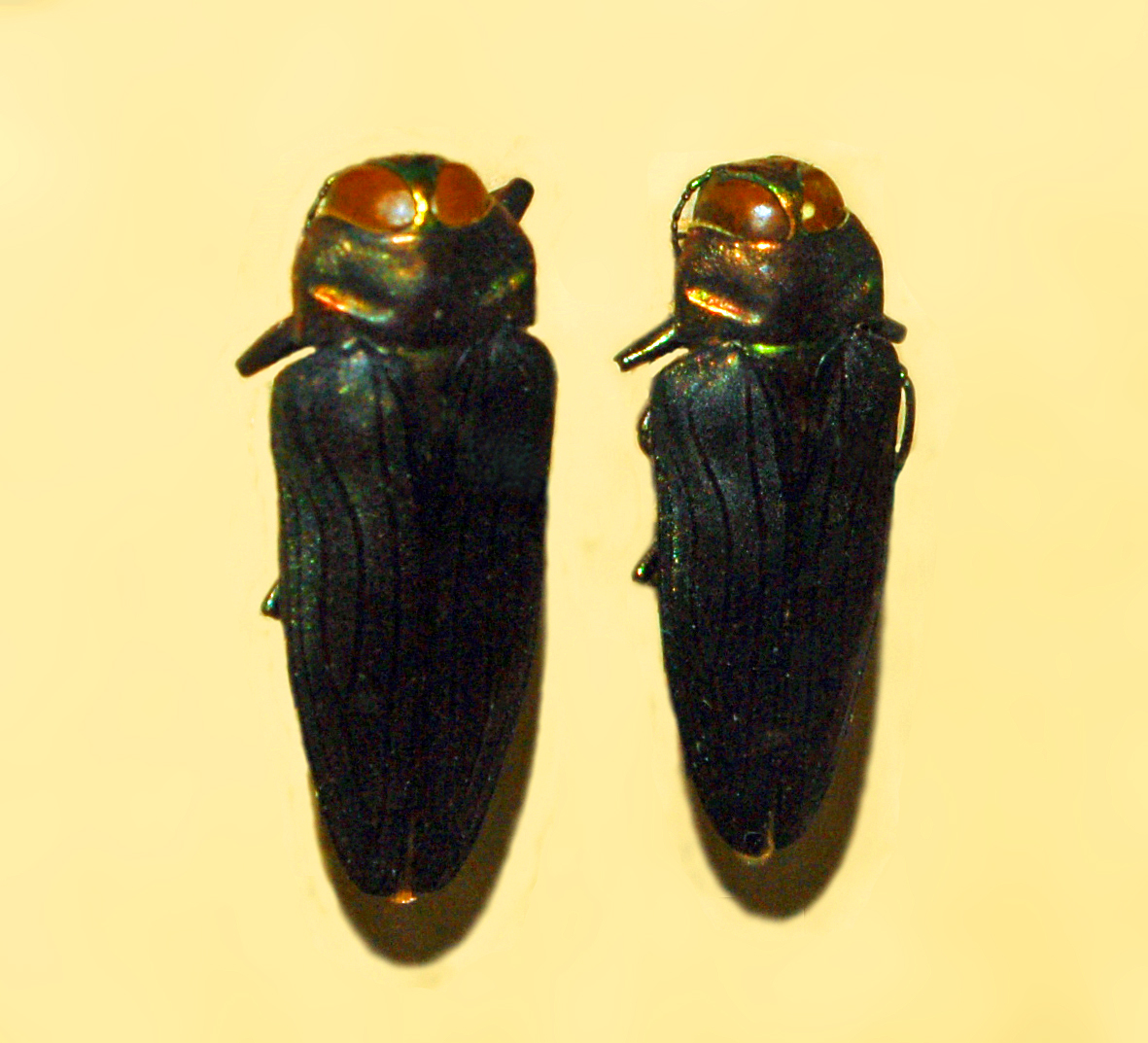
Belionota prasina

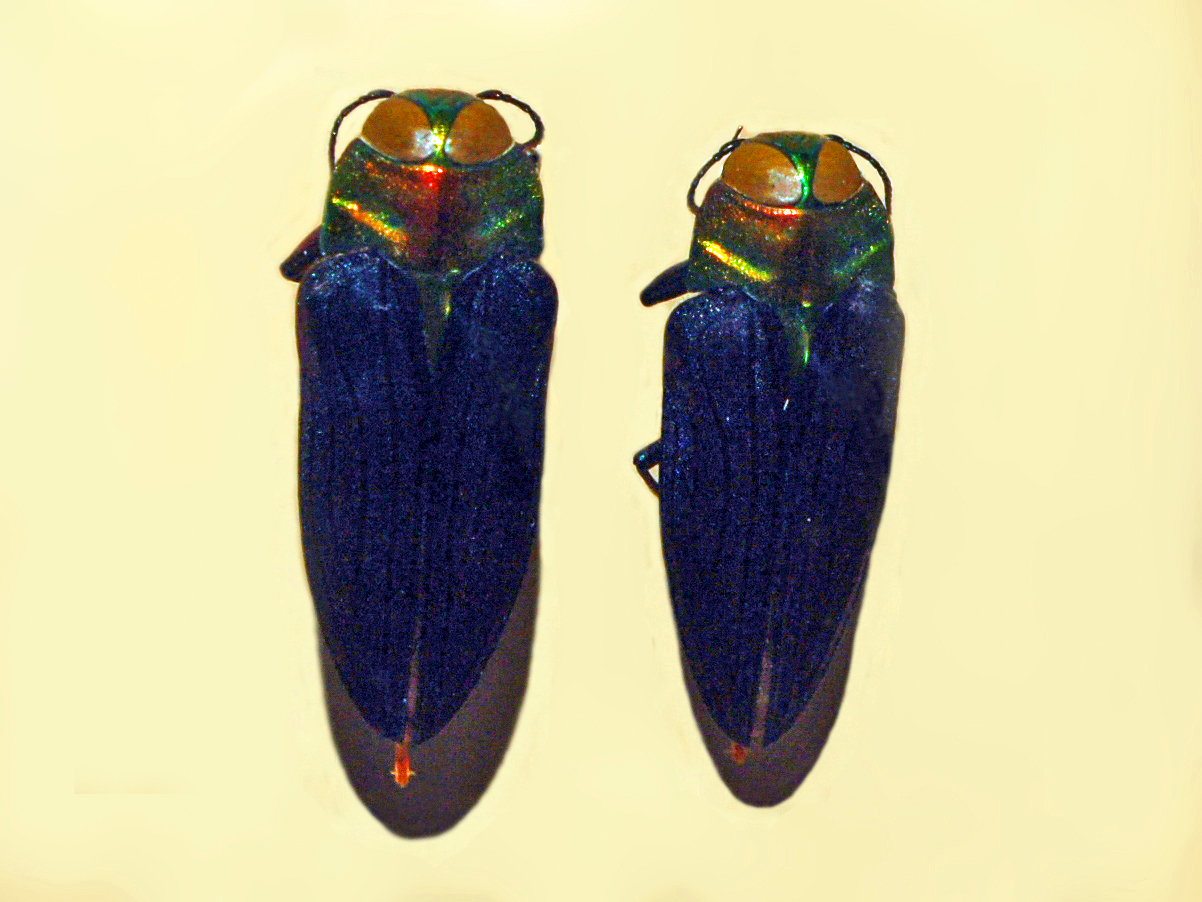
Belionota sagittaria

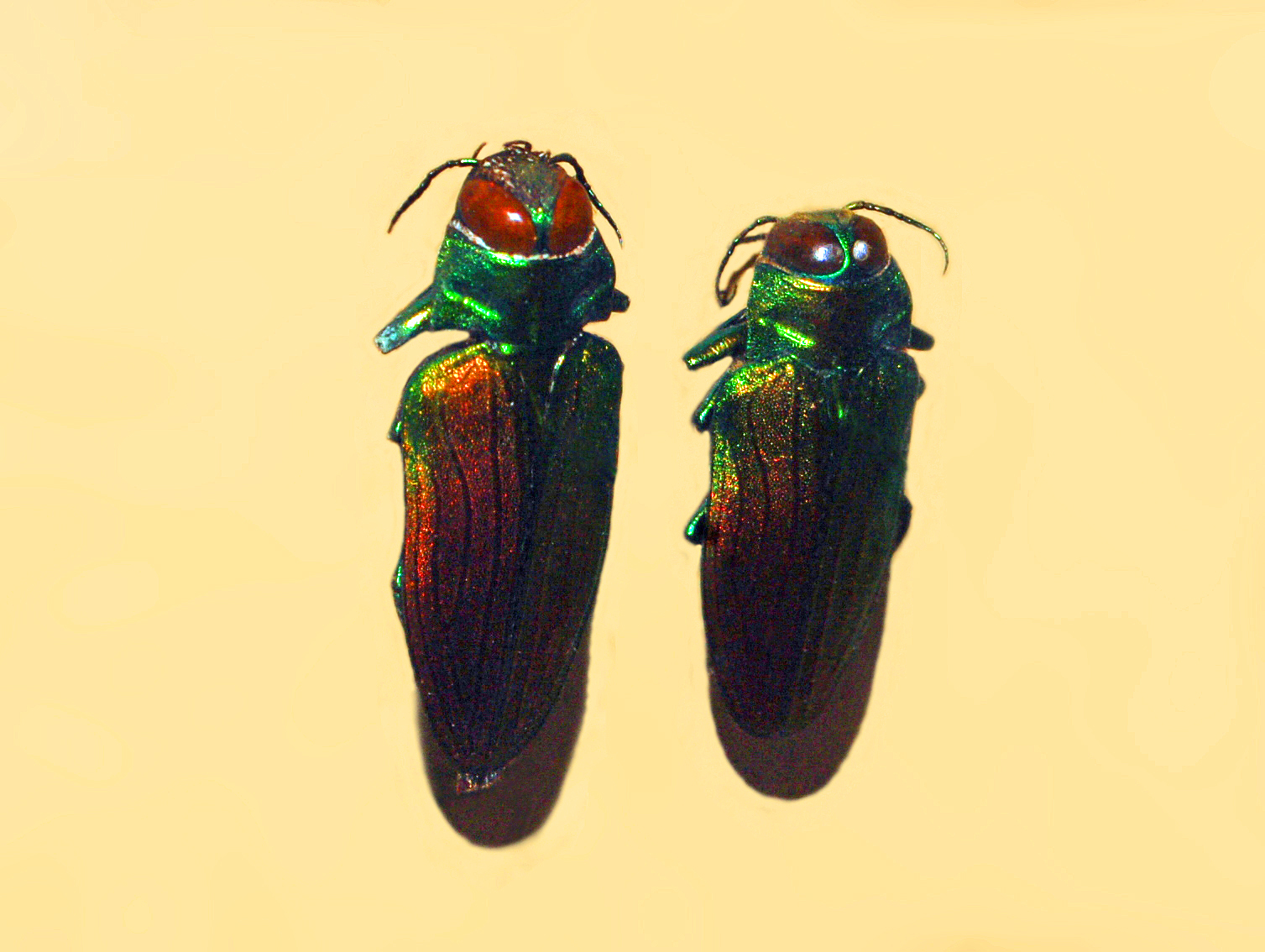
Belionota sumptuosa

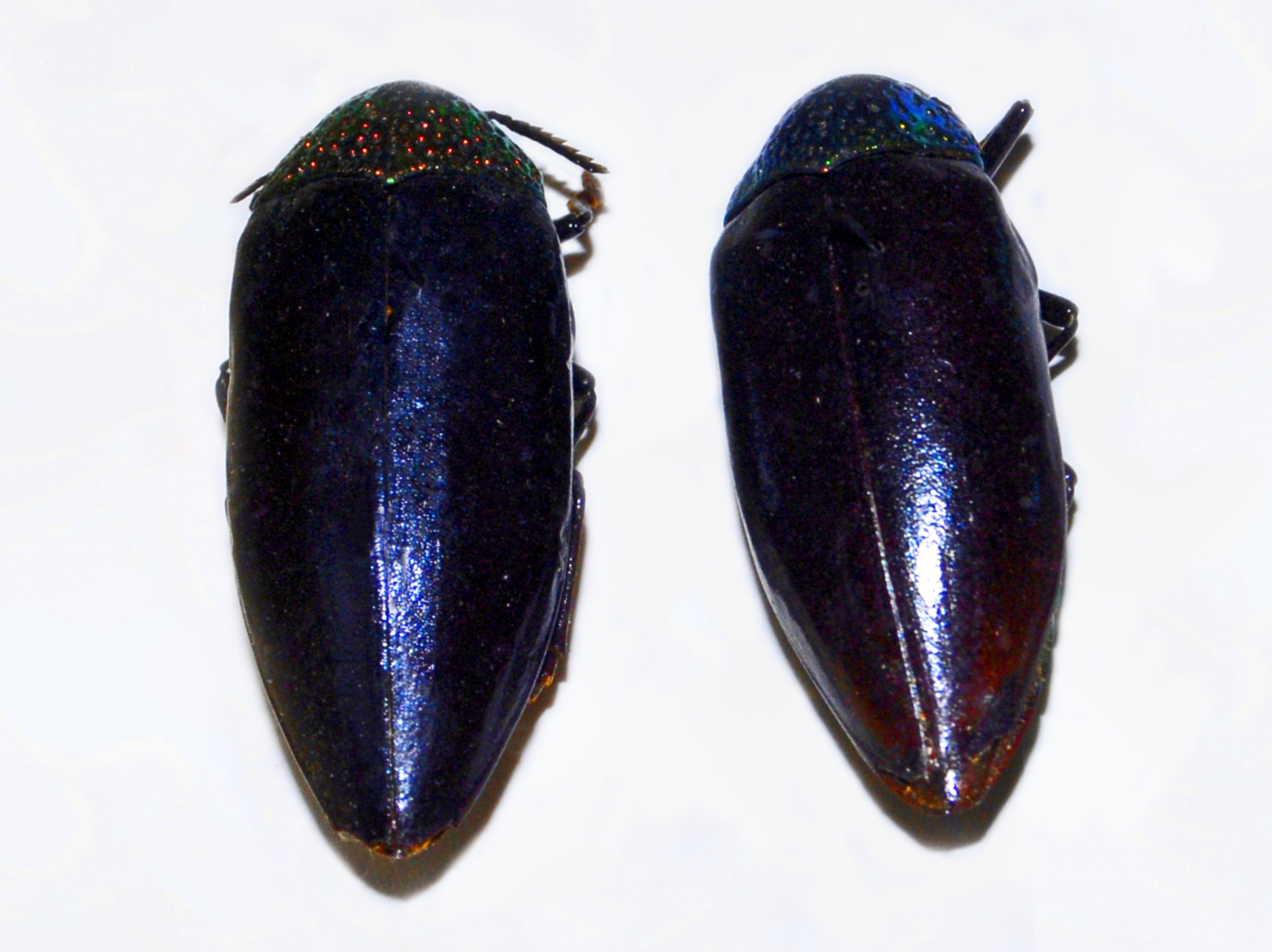
Sternocera chrysis

=== Family: Callirhipidae - Cedar beetle ===
- Callirhipis fasciata

=== Family: Cantharidae - Soldier beetle ===
- Caccodes extensicornis
- Maltypus bibilensis
- Maltypus kokagalaensis
- Maltypus pidurutalagalanus
- Microichthyurus sublateralis
- Microichthyurus sylvicola
- Silis ekisi
- Silis incisa

=== Family: Carabidae - Ground beetles ===
- Abacetus antiquus
- Abacetus atratus
- Abacetus bipunctatus
- Abacetus cordicollis
- Abacetus dejeani
- Abacetus flavipes
- Abacetus guttula
- Abacetus pallipes
- Abacetus pomptus
- Abacetus rufopiceus
- Abacetus semimetallicus
- Abacetus testaceipes
- Abacidus atratus
- Acupalpus derogatus
- Acupalpus sinuellus
- Agonum (Agonum) chinense
- Agonum illocatum
- Agonum japonicum
- Amblystomus bivittatus
- Amblystomus femoralis
- Amblystomus fuscescens
- Amblystomus guttatus
- Amblystomus guttula
- Amblystomus indicus
- Amblystomus mandibularis
- Amblystomus punctatus
- Amblystomus quadriguttatus
- Amblystomus stenolophoides
- Amblystomus vulneratus
- Anaulacus adelioides
- Anaulacus fasciatus - ssp. fasciatus
- Anaulacus opaculus
- Anaulacus pleuronectes
- Anchista brunnea
- Anomotachys acaroides
- Anomotarus decoratus
- Anomotarus stigmula
- Anthracus anamensis
- Anthracus horni
- Apotomus atripennis
- Apristus cupreus
- Apristus subtransparens
- Arame macra
- Archicolliuris bimaculata - ssp. bimaculata
- Archicolliuris immaculata
- Ardistomopsis myrmex
- Ardistomopsis ovicollis
- Argiloborus amblygonus
- Argiloborus ceylanicus
- Argiloborus curtus
- Argiloborus monticola
- Argiloborus stricticollis
- Arrowina pygmaea
- Arrowina taprobanae
- Batoscelis oblonga
- Bembidion foveolatum
- Bembidion opulentum - ssp. opulentum
- Brachinus immaculicornis - ssp. immaculicornis
- Brachinus limbellus
- Brachinus pictus
- Brachinus sexmaculatus
- Brachinus tetracolon
- Brachyodes subolivaceus
- Brachyodes virens
- Bradybaenus festivus
- Caelostomus picipes
- Caelostomus sculptipennis
- Calleida splendidula
- Callistomimus littoralis - ssp. ceylonicus
- Callistomimus pernix
- Callytron limosum
- Catascopus cingalensis
- Catascopus whithillii
- Cerapterus latipes
- Chlaeminus biguttatus
- Chlaenius bengalensis
- Chlaenius bioculatus
- Chlaenius circumdatus - ssp. circumdatus
- Chlaenius cyanostolus
- Chlaenius fastigatus
- Chlaenius fletcheri
- Chlaenius hamifer
- Chlaenius henryi
- Chlaenius inops
- Chlaenius kerkvoordeae
- Chlaenius laetiusculus
- Chlaenius laetus
- Chlaenius lafertei
- Chlaenius leucops
- Chlaenius macropus
- Chlaenius malachinus
- Chlaenius nepalensis
- Chlaenius nigricans
- Chlaenius oodioides
- Chlaenius orbicollis
- Chlaenius parallelus
- Chlaenius pretiosus
- Chlaenius pulcher
- Chlaenius punctatostriatus
- Chlaenius ruficauda
- Chlaenius rufifemoratus
- Chlaenius rugulosus
- Chlaenius scapularis
- Chlaenius tetragonoderus - ssp. tetragonoderus
- Chlaenius trachys
- Chlaenius velocipes
- Chlaenius xanthospilus
- Cicindela aurulenta - ssp. juxtata
- Cicindela bicolor - ssp. haemorrhoidalis, xanthospilota
- Cicindela calligramma
- Cicindela cardoni
- Cicindela ceylonensis
- Cicindela discrepans
- Cicindela diversa
- Cicindela fischeri - ssp. fischeri
- Cicindela flavomaculata - ssp. flavomaculata
- Cicindela lacrymans
- Cicindela ocellata
- Cicindela separata
- Cicindela severa
- Cicindela sylvicola
- Clivina castanea
- Clivina elongatula
- Clivina forcipata
- Clivina mustela
- Clivina obenbergeri
- Clivina striata
- Clivina tranquebarica
- Clivina westwoodi
- Clypeuspinus validus
- Coleolissus iris
- Collyris dohrnii - ssp. dohrnii
- Colpodes bipars
- Colpodes fletcheri
- Colpodes iteratus
- Colpodes repletus
- Colpodes retusus
- Colpodes sebosus
- Colpodes xenos
- Coptodera chaudoiri - ssp. chaudoiri
- Coptodera eluta
- Coptodera interrupta
- Coptolobus anodon
- Coptolobus ater
- Coptolobus glabriculus
- Coptolobus latus
- Coptolobus lucens
- Coptolobus omodon
- Coryza maculata
- Craspedophorus angulatus
- Craspedophorus bifasciatus
- Craspedophorus elegans
- Craspedophorus halyi
- Craspedophorus microspilotus
- Creagris labrosa
- Crepidogaster ceylanica
- Crepidogaster horni
- Cyclosomus flexuosus
- Cylindera dormeri
- Cylindera ganglbaueri
- Cylindera henryi
- Cylindera labioaenea - ssp. labioaenea
- Cylindera lacunosa
- Cylindera nietneri
- Cylindera paradoxa
- Cylindera singalensis
- Cylindera waterhousei
- Cylindera willeyi
- Cymindoidea munda
- Derocrania agnes
- Derocrania concinna
- Derocrania flavicornis
- Derocrania fusiformis
- Derocrania glabiceps
- GleneDerocrania halyi
- Derocrania intricatorugulosa
- Derocrania jaechi
- Derocrania nematodes
- Derocrania nietneri
- Derocrania shaumi
- Derocrania scitiscabra
- Desera geniculata
- Dicaelindus impunctatus
- Diceromerus orientalis
- Dicranoncus cinctipennis
- Dicranoncus queenslandicus
- Dicranoncus ravus
- Dioryche chinnada
- Dioryche colombensis
- Dioryche sericea
- Dioryche torta - ssp. torta
- Diplocheila daldorfi
- Diplocheila laevis
- Diplocheila polita
- Dischissus notulatus
- Distichus mahratta
- Distichus picicornis
- Distichus puncticollis
- Distichus uncinatus
- Dolichoctis chitra
- Dolichoctis goniodera
- Dolichoctis marginifer
- Dolichoctis strita - ssp. striata
- Dolichoctis vitticollis
- Dromius orthogonioides
- Drypta lineola - ssp. lineola
- Drypta mastersii
- Dyschirius bengalensis
- Dyschirius mahratta
- Dyschirius ordinatus
- Dyschirius paucipunctus
- Elaphropus amabilis - ssp. orantus
- Elaphropus amplians
- Elaphropus arcuatus
- Elaphropus ceylanicus
- Elaphropus charis
- Elaphropus decoratus
- Elaphropus diabrachys
- Elaphropus eueides
- Elaphropus finitimus
- Elaphropus granarius
- Elaphropus horni
- Elaphropus interpunctatus
- Elaphropus klugii
- Elaphropus latus
- Elaphropus nalandae
- Elaphropus nilgiricus
- Elaphropus notaphoides
- Elaphropus occultus
- Elaphropus ovatus
- Elaphropus peryphinus
- Elaphropus politus - ssp. politus
- Elaphropus rubescens
- Elaphropus suturalis
- Endynomena pradieri
- Eucolliuris fuscipennis
- Euplynes marginatus
- Euschizomerus denticollis
- Eustra ceylanica
- Gnaphon costatus
- Gnathaphanus vulneripennis
- Gnopheroides pearsoni
- Harpaglossus opacus
- Helluodes taprobanae
- Heteropaussus taprobanensis
- Holcocoleus melanopus
- Holcoderus fissus
- Holcoderus praemorsus
- Hololeius ceylanicus
- Hypaetha biramosa - sp. biramosa
- Hypaetha quadrilineata
- Hyphaereon consors
- Hyphaereon hornianus
- Hyphaereon maculatus
- Hyphaereon vittatus
- Idiomorphus guerini
- Jansenia cirrhidia
- Jansenia corticata
- Jansenia laeticolor
- Jansenia stellata
- Jansenia westermanni
- Lachnothorax biguttatus
- Lasiocera coromandelica
- Lebia dichroma
- Lebia exsanguis
- Lebia leucaspis
- Lebia lunigera
- Lebia monostigma
- Leleuporella sexangulata
- Lionychus albivittis
- Lionychus horni
- Lophyra cancellata
- Lophyra catena - ssp. catena, insularis
- Lorostema alutacea - ssp. alutacea, spinipennis
- Loxocrepis ruficeps
- Loxoncus discophorus
- Loxoncus microgonus
- Loxoncus nagpurensis
- Loxoncus renitens
- Loxoncus schmidti
- Macrocheilus bensoni
- Macrocheilus niger
- Masoreus orientalis
- Mastax euanthes
- Mastax histrio
- Melaenus piger
- Melanospilus andrewesi
- Metacolpodes buchannani
- Metazuphium spinangulis
- Microlestes demessus - ssp. demessus
- Microlestes inconspicuus
- Microlestes xanthopus
- Mimocolliuris pilifera
- Mimocolliuris stigma
- Miscelus javanus
- Miscelus unicolor
- Mochtherus tetraspilotus
- Morion cucujoides
- Morion orientalis
- Myriochila distinguenda
- Myriochila fastidiosa - ssp. fastidiosa
- Myriochila undulata
- Nanodiodes piceus
- Nanodiodes westermanni
- Neocollyris aenea
- Neocollyris ceylonica
- Neocollyris crassicornis - ssp. crassicornis
- Neocollyris planifrontoides
- Neocollyris plicaticollis
- Neocollyris punctatella
- Neocollyris saundersii - ssp. laetior, saundersii
- Neocollyris sedlaceki
- Neocollyris tuberculata
- Neocollyris vedda
- Nototachys comptus
- Omphra hirta
- Omphra pilosa
- Omphra rufipes
- Oodes angustatus
- Oodes bivittatus
- Oodes taprobanae
- Oodes xanthochilus
- Ooidius advolans
- Oosoma gyllenhalii
- Oosoma semivittatum
- Ophionea ceylonica
- Ophionea indica
- Ophionea interstitialis
- Ophionea nigrofasciata - ssp. nigrofasciata
- Ophoniscus insulicola
- Ophoniscus iridulus
- Orthogonius acutangulus
- Orthogonius batesi
- Orthogonius femoralis
- Orthogonius fugax
- Orthogonius longicornis
- Orthogonius ovatulus
- Orthogonius parallelus
- Orthogonius planiger
- Orthogonius schaumi
- Orthogonius srilankaicus
- Oxylobus lateralis - ssp. designans
- Oxylobus ovalipennis
- Oxylobus porcatus
- Paradromius steno
- Paraphaea binotata
- Parena nigrolineata
- Parophonus compositus
- Parophonus cyaneotinctus
- Parophonus javanus
- Parophonus lividus
- Parophonus nagpurensis - ssp. curvatus
- Paussus desneuxi
- Paussus escherichi
- Paussus fletcheri
- Paussus horni
- Paussus pacificus
- Paussus politus
- Peliocypas catenatus
- Peliocypas euproctoides
- Peliocypas fuscus
- Peliocypas intermedius
- Peliocypas levipennis
- Peliocypas malleus
- Peliocypas oryctus
- Peliocypas repandus
- Peliocypas trigonus
- Pelocharis remyi
- Pentagonica ceylonica
- Pentagonica erichsoni
- Pentagonica horni
- Pentagonica pallipes
- Pentagonica ruficeps
- Pentagonica ruficollis
- Pentagonica venusta
- Perigona castanea
- Perigona nigriceps
- Perigona nigricollis
- Perigona nigrifrons
- Perigona plagiata
- Perigona sinuaticollis
- Perigona tronqueti
- Perileptus ceylanicus
- Perileptus indicus
- Peripristus ater
- Pheropsophus bimaculatus
- Pheropsophus catoirei
- Pheropsophus chaudoiri
- Pheropsophus discicollis
- Pheropsophus lissoderus
- Pheropsophus occipitalis
- Pheropsophus picicollis
- Physocrotaphus ceylonicus
- Physodera eschscholtzii
- Planetes bimaculatus
- Planetes elegans
- Planetes ruficeps
- Planetes ruficollis
- Planetes simplex
- Platymetopus flavilabris
- Platymetopus keiseri
- Platymetopus pictus
- Platymetopus rugosus
- Platytarus boysii
- Prothyma proxima
- Protocollyris planifrons
- Pseudoclivina memnonia
- Pseudognathaphanus dispellens
- Pseudognathaphanus punctilabris
- Pseudognathaphanus rusticus
- Pterostichus atratus
- Scarites ceylonicus
- Scarites indus
- Scarites selene
- Selina westermanni
- Sericoda ceylonica
- Siagona depressa - ssp. depressa
- Siagona fabricii
- Siagona plana
- Somotrichus unifasciatus
- Stenolophus opaculus
- Stenolophus pallipes
- Stenolophus polygenus
- Stenolophus quinquepustulatus
- Stenolophus rectifrons
- Stenolophus smaragdulus
- Stomonaxellus ceylanensis
- Styphlomerus fusciceps
- Syleter porphyreus
- Syleter validus
- Syntomus quadripunctatus
- Tachys brachys
- Tachys euryodes
- Tachys fasciatus - ssp. faciatus
- Tachys impressipennis
- Tachys incertus
- Tachys opalescens
- Tachys quadrillum
- Tachys sexguttatus
- Tachys tropicus
- Tachys truncatus
- Tachys umbrosa
- Tantillus brunneus
- Tantillus vittatus
- Tetragonoderus cursor
- Tetragonoderus fimbriatus
- Tetragonoderus notaphioides
- Tetragonoderus quadrinotatus
- Trichotichnus hiekei
- Trichotichnus lamprus
- Trichotichnus lucens
- Trichotichnus marginalis
- Trichotichnus nitens
- Trichotichnus pseudolucens
- Tricondyla coriacea
- Tricondyla femorata
- Tricondyla granulifera
- Tricondyla nigripalpis
- Trigonotoma indica
- Trilophidius impunctatus
- Trilophus arcuatus
- Xenodochus mediocris
- Zuphium dabreui
- Zuphium erebeum
- Zuphium olens
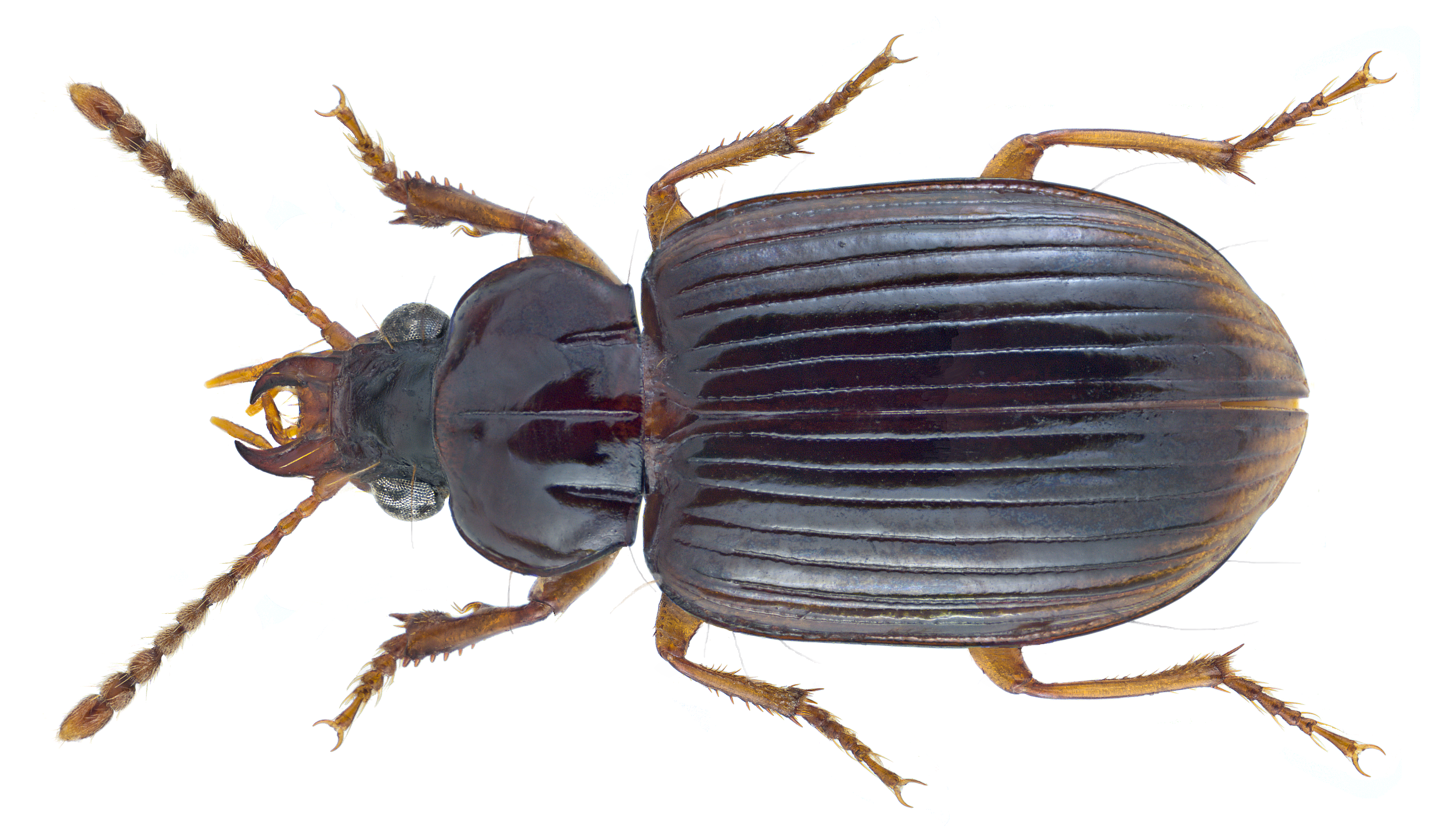
Caelostomus picipes

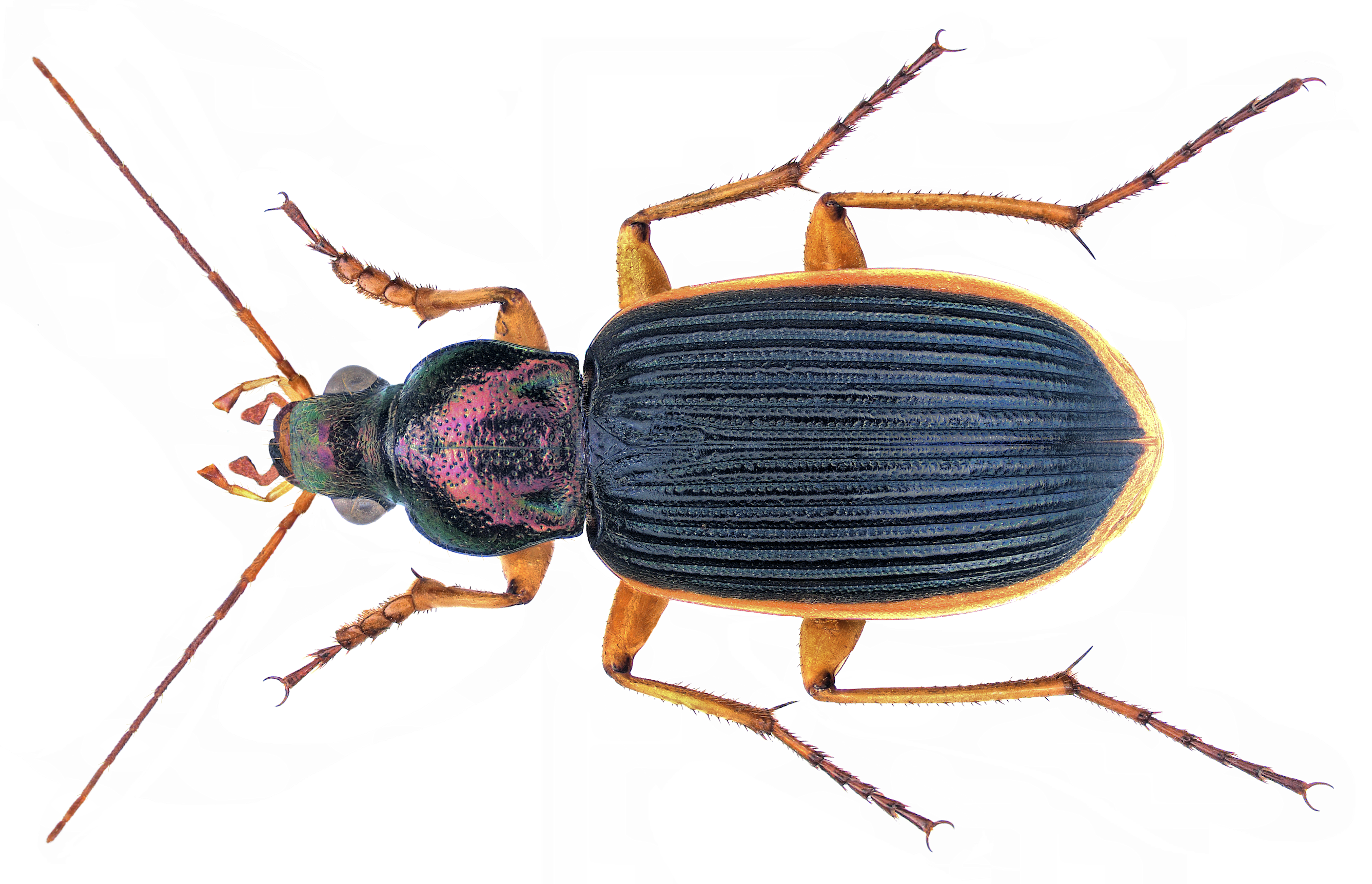
Chlaenius nigricans

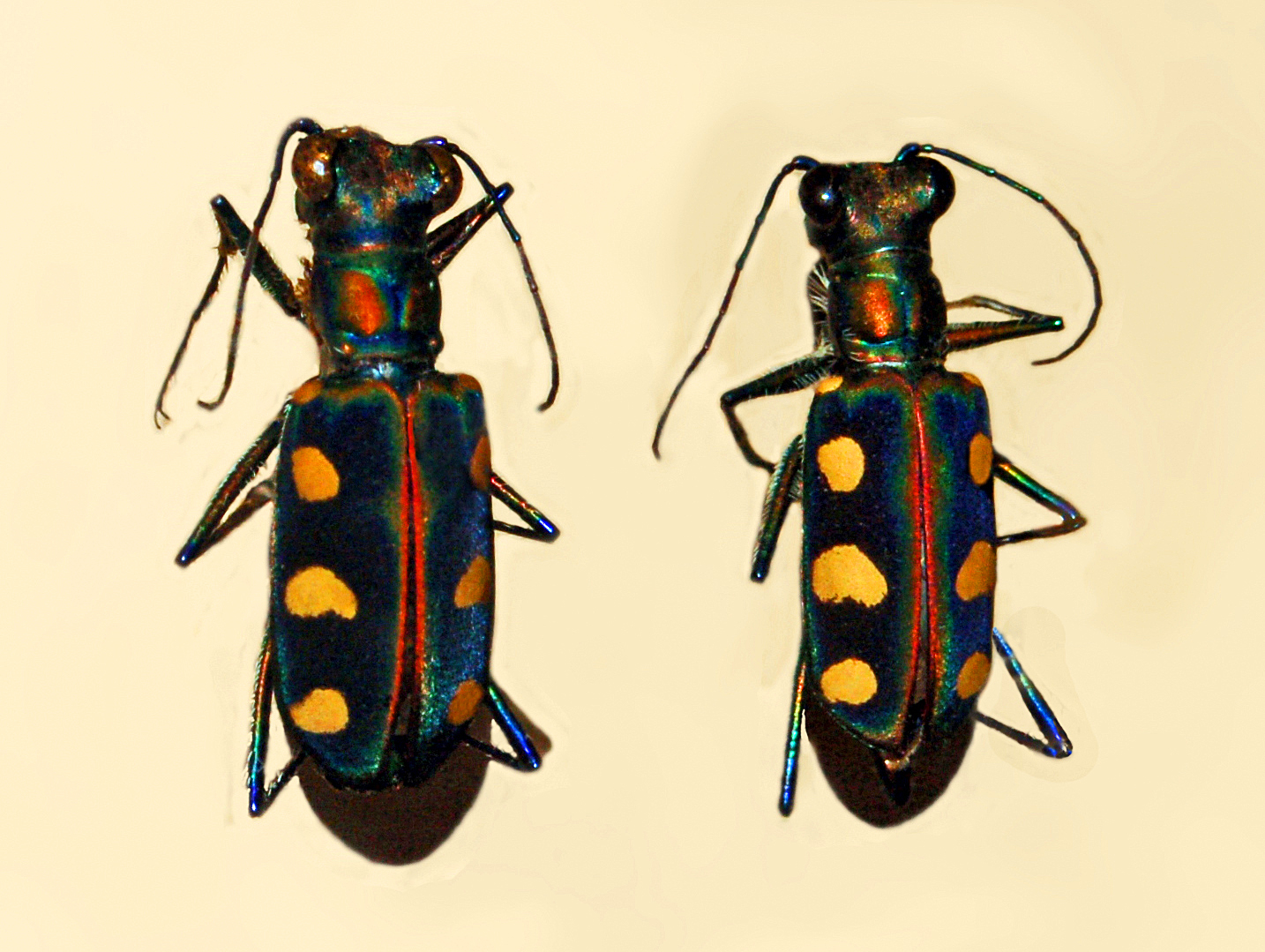
Cicindela aurulenta

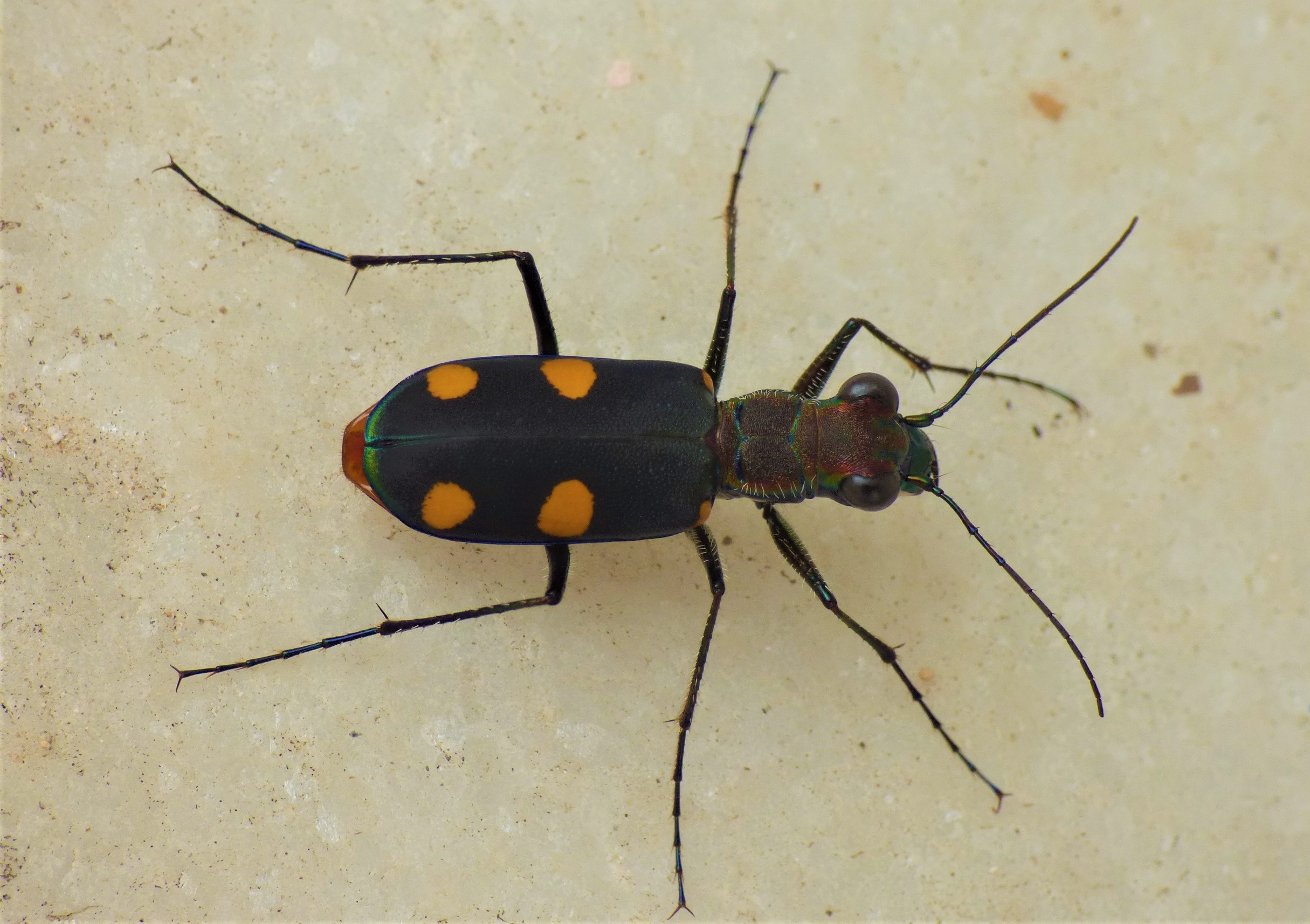
Cicindella bicolor

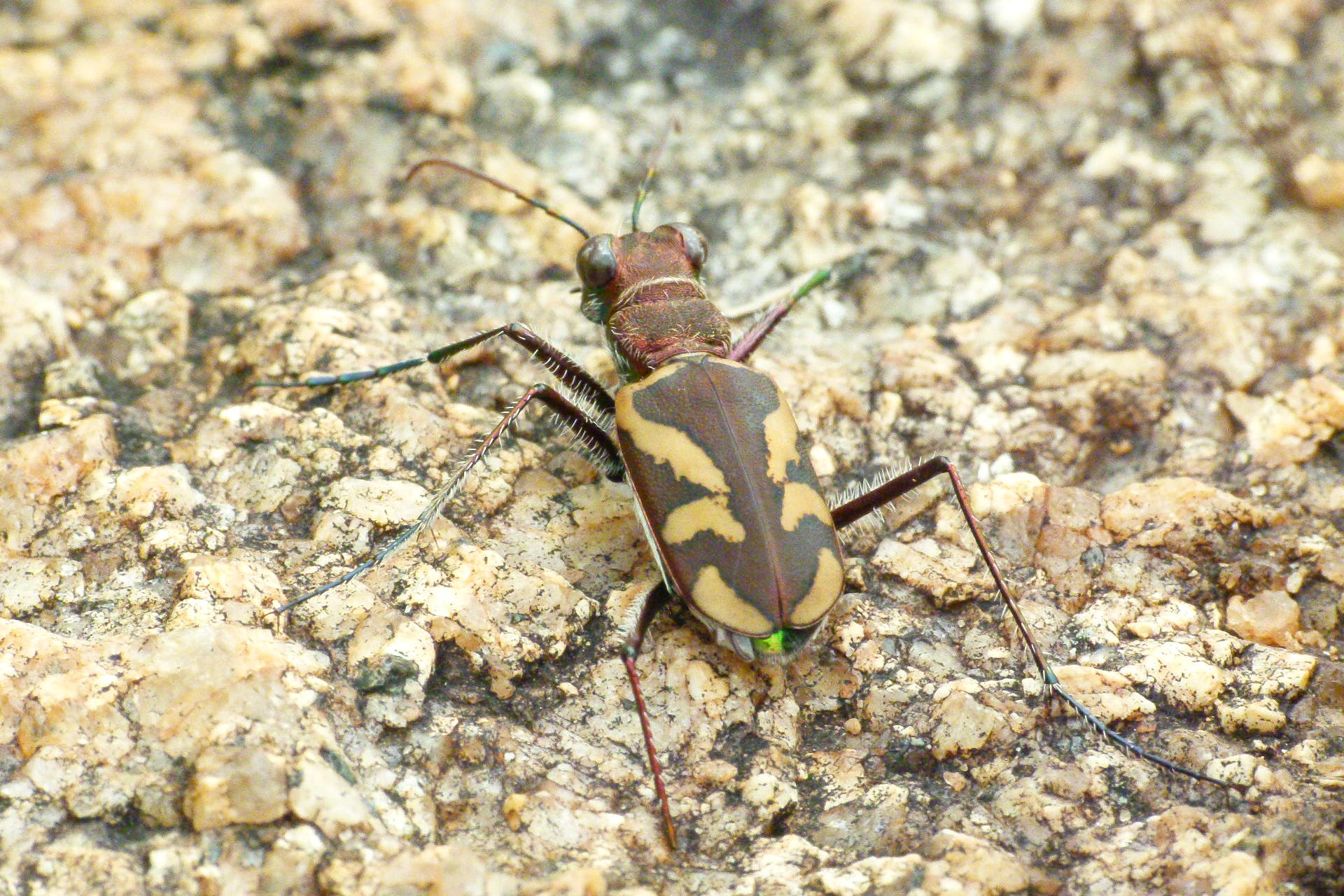
Cicindela calligramma

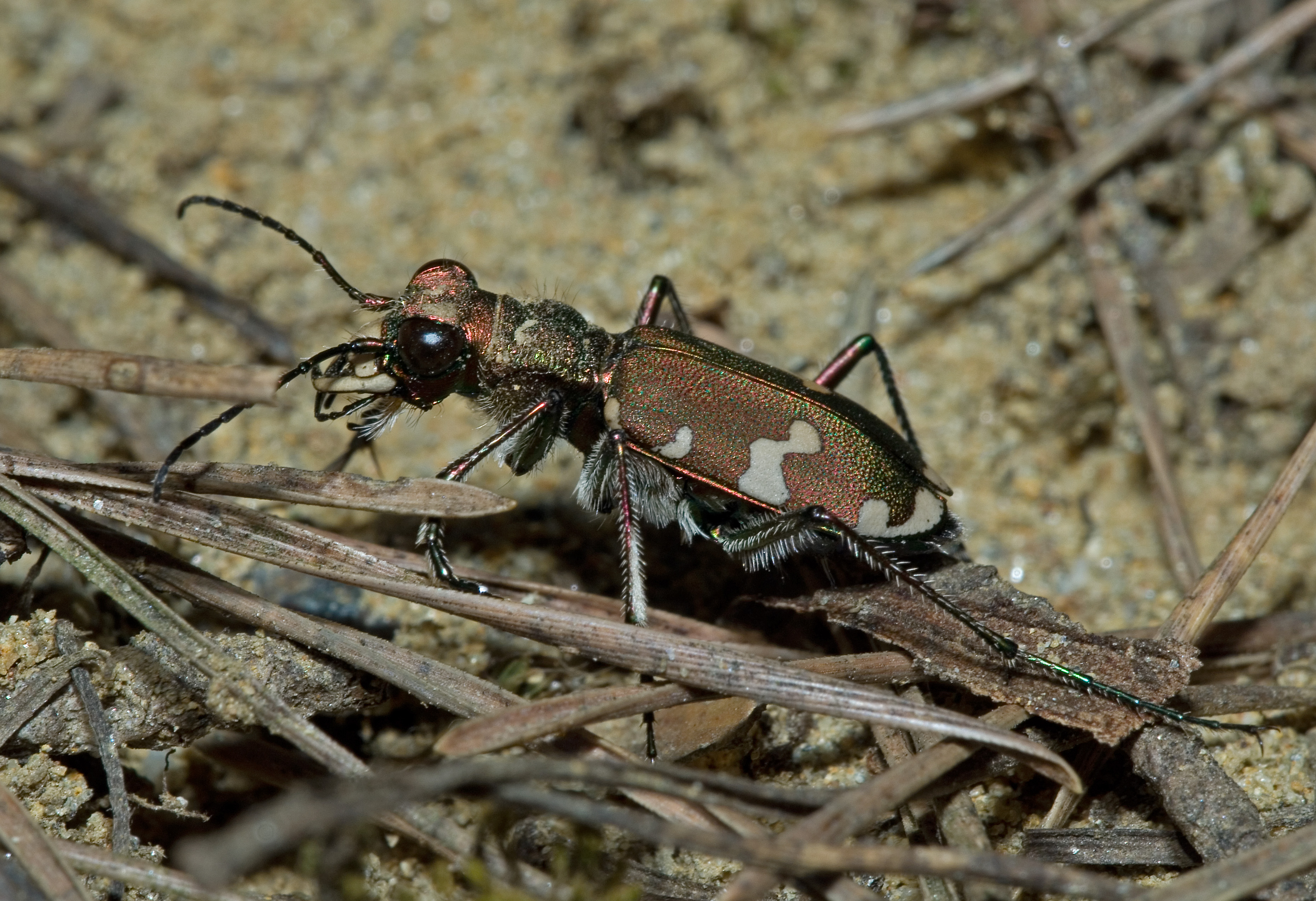
Cicindela sylvicola

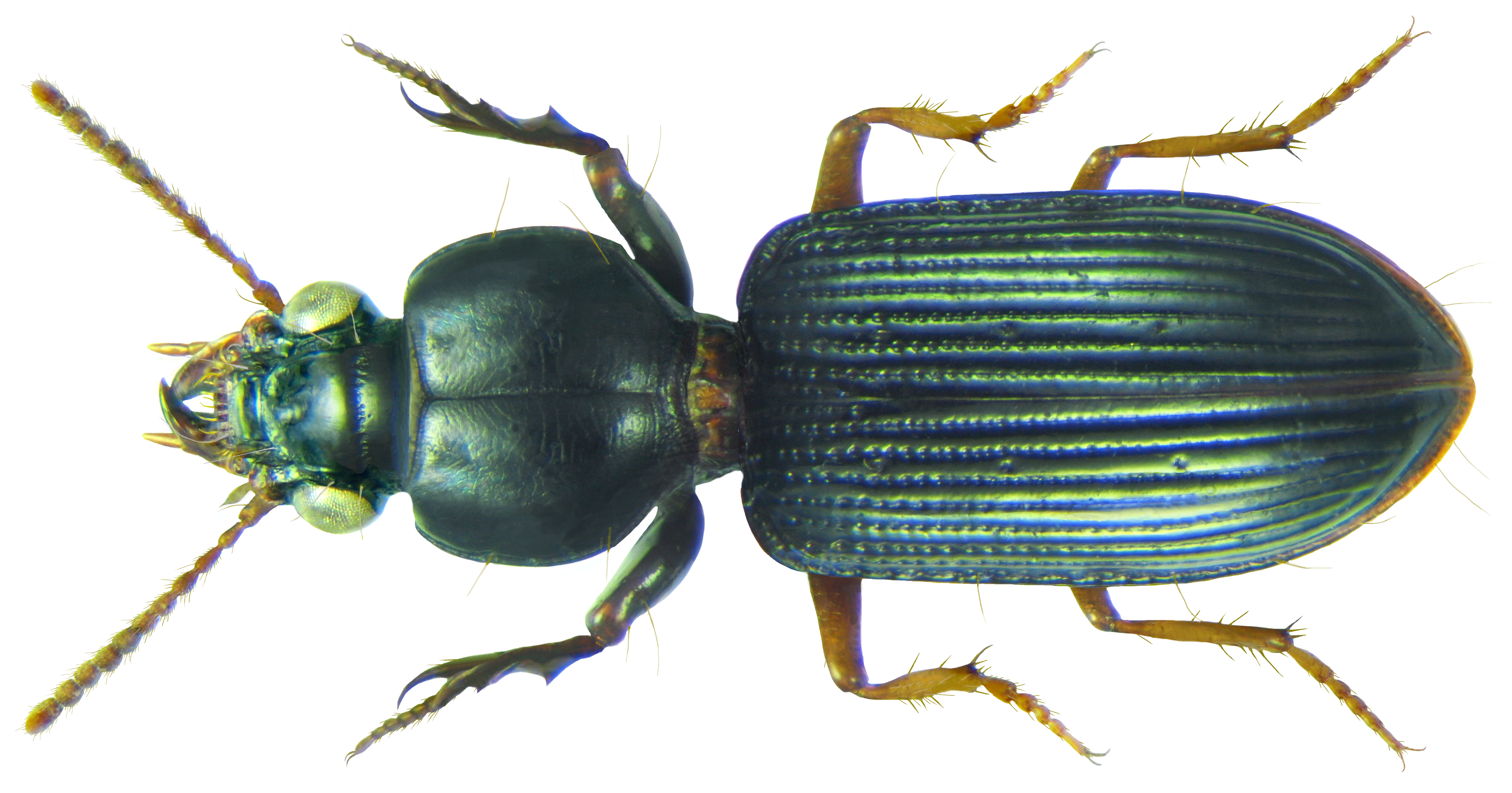
Clivina tranquebarica

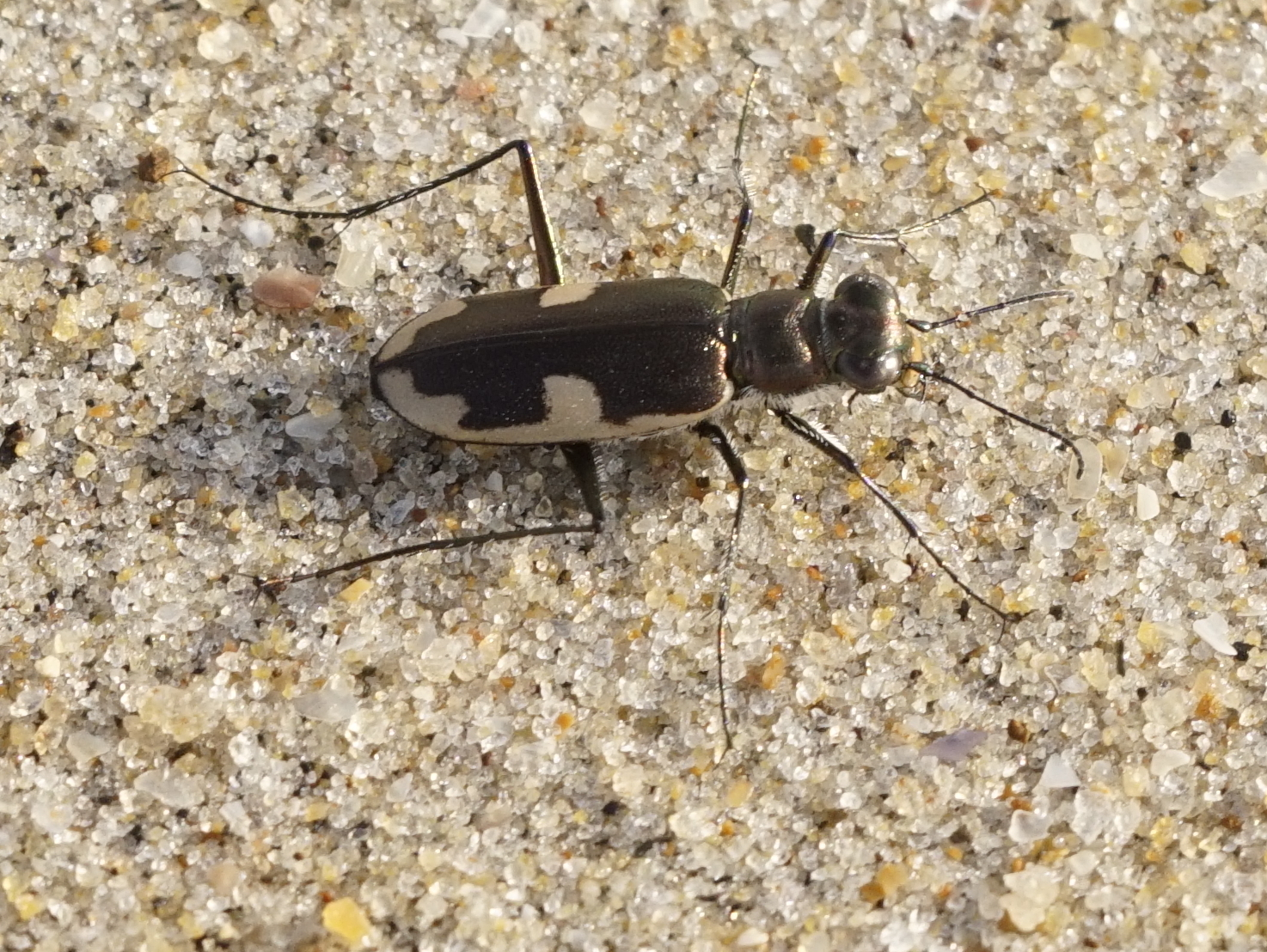
Hypaetha biramosa

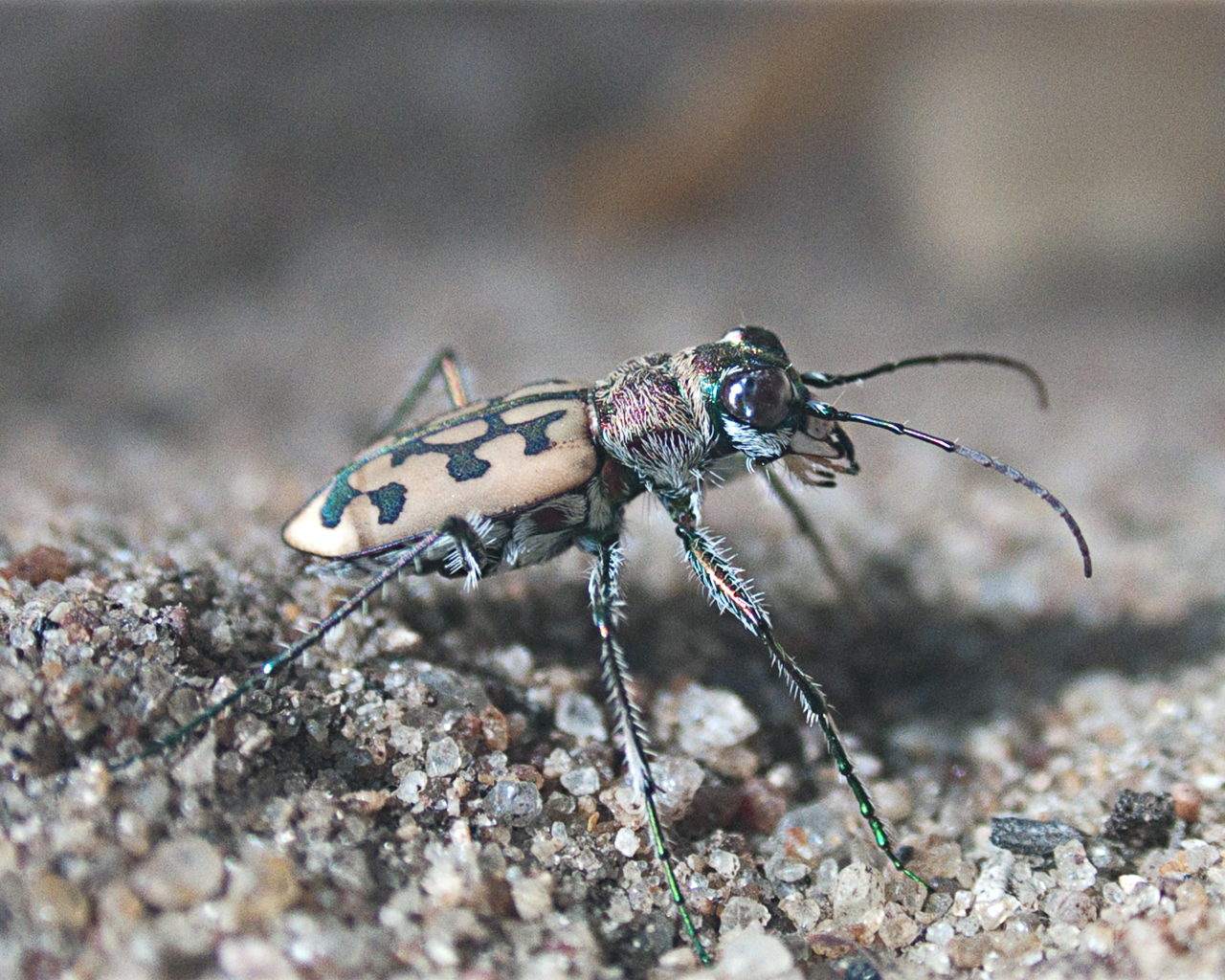
Lophyra catena

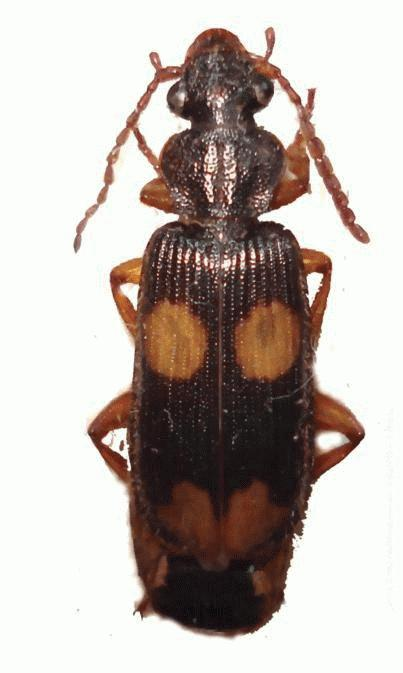
Macrocheilus bensoni

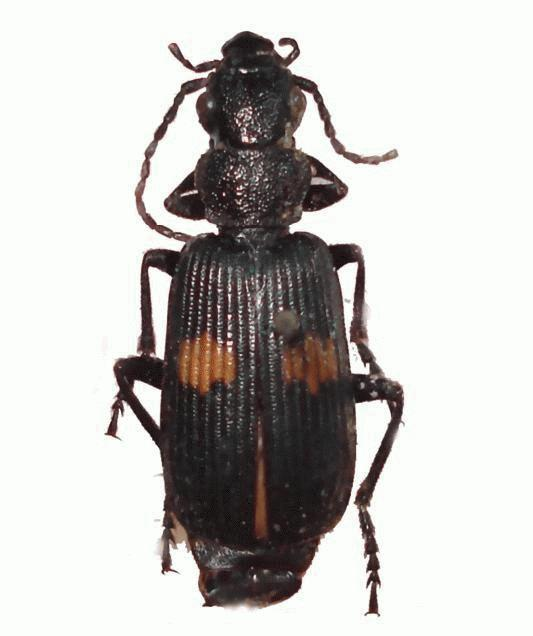
Macrocheilus niger

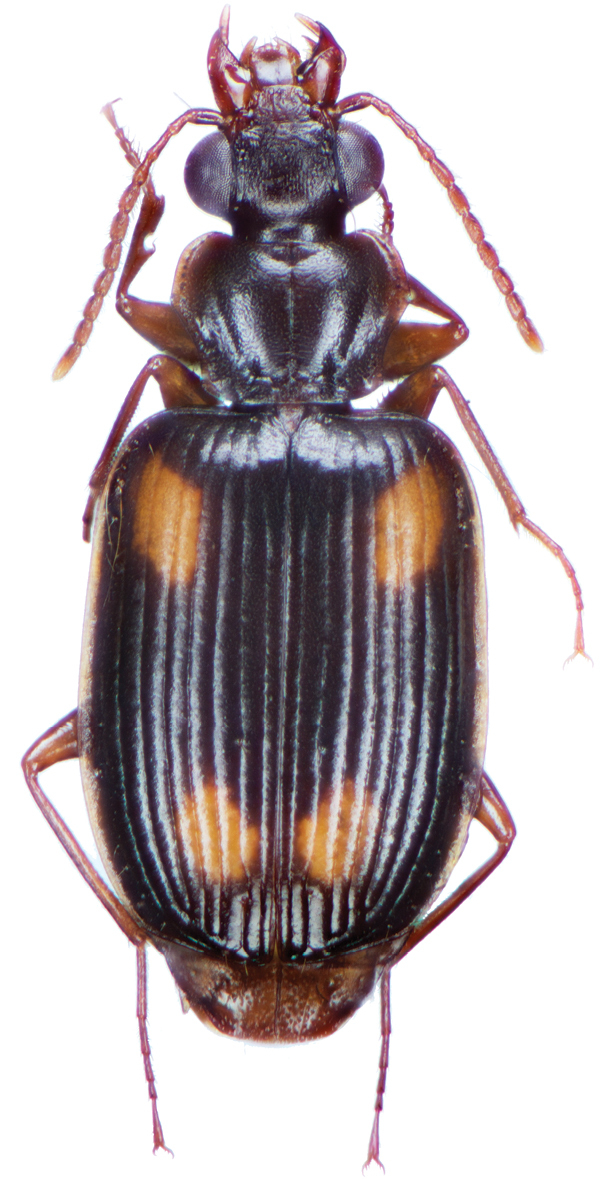
Mochtherus tetraspilotus

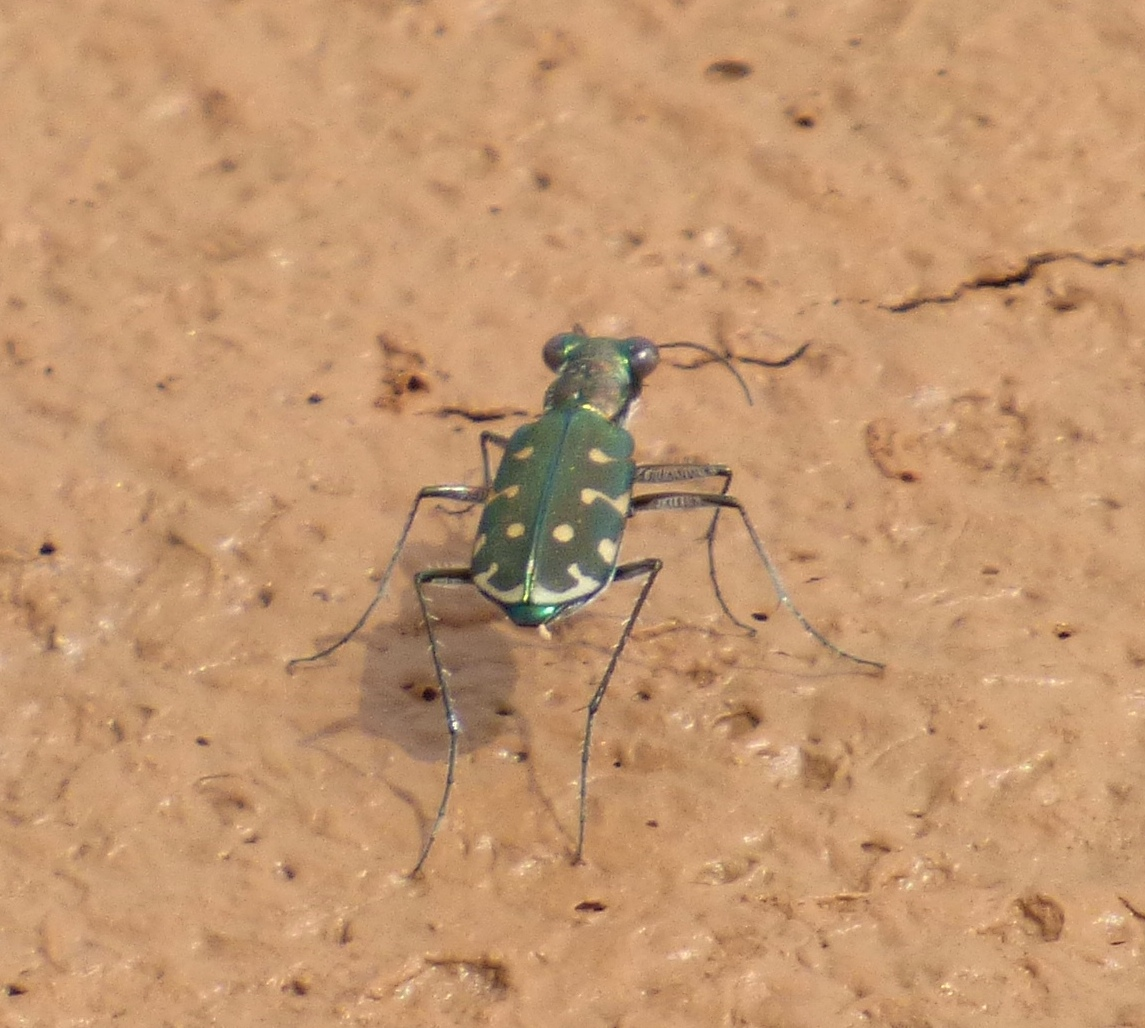
Myriochila distinguenda

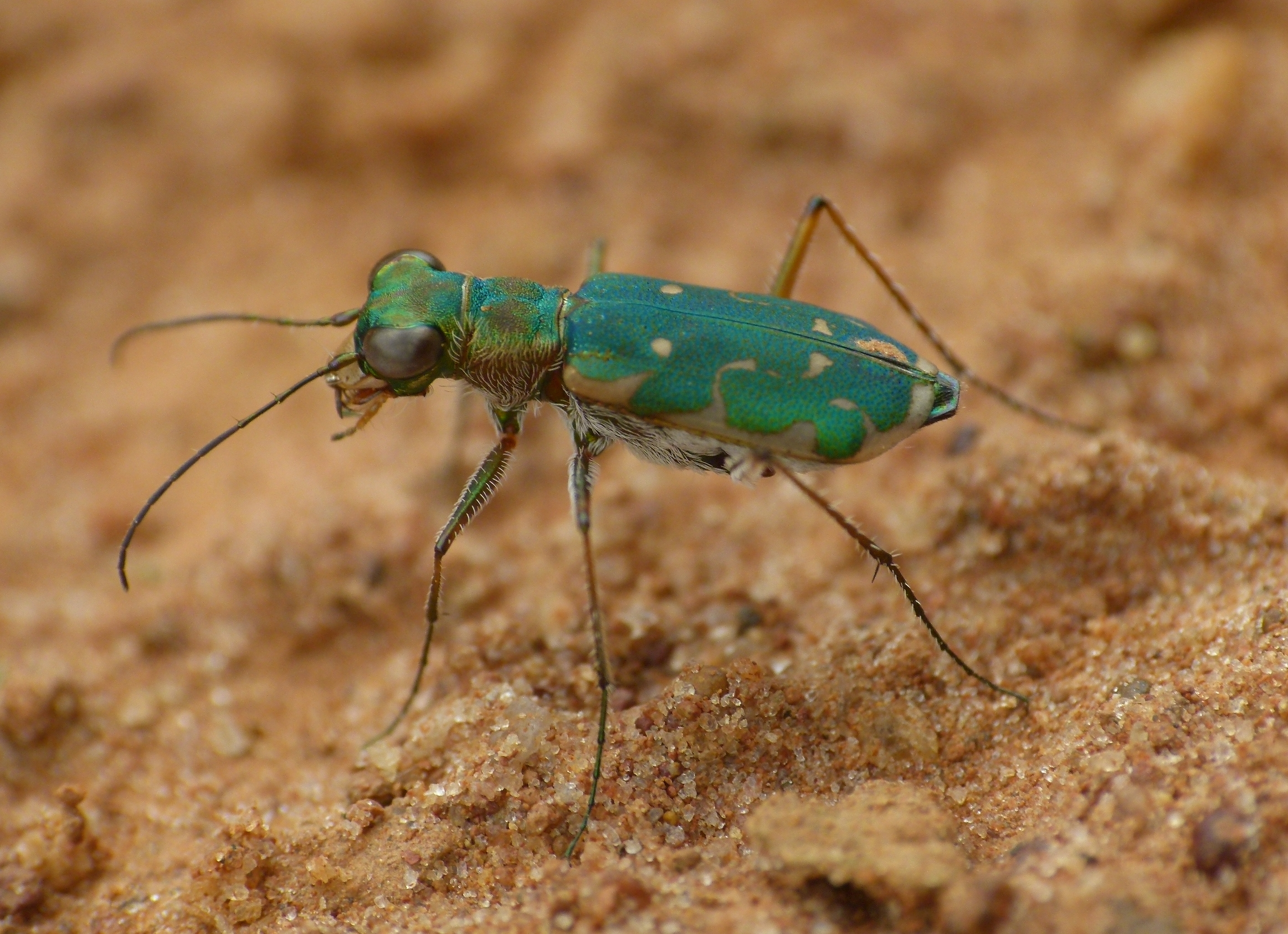
Myriochila fastidiosa

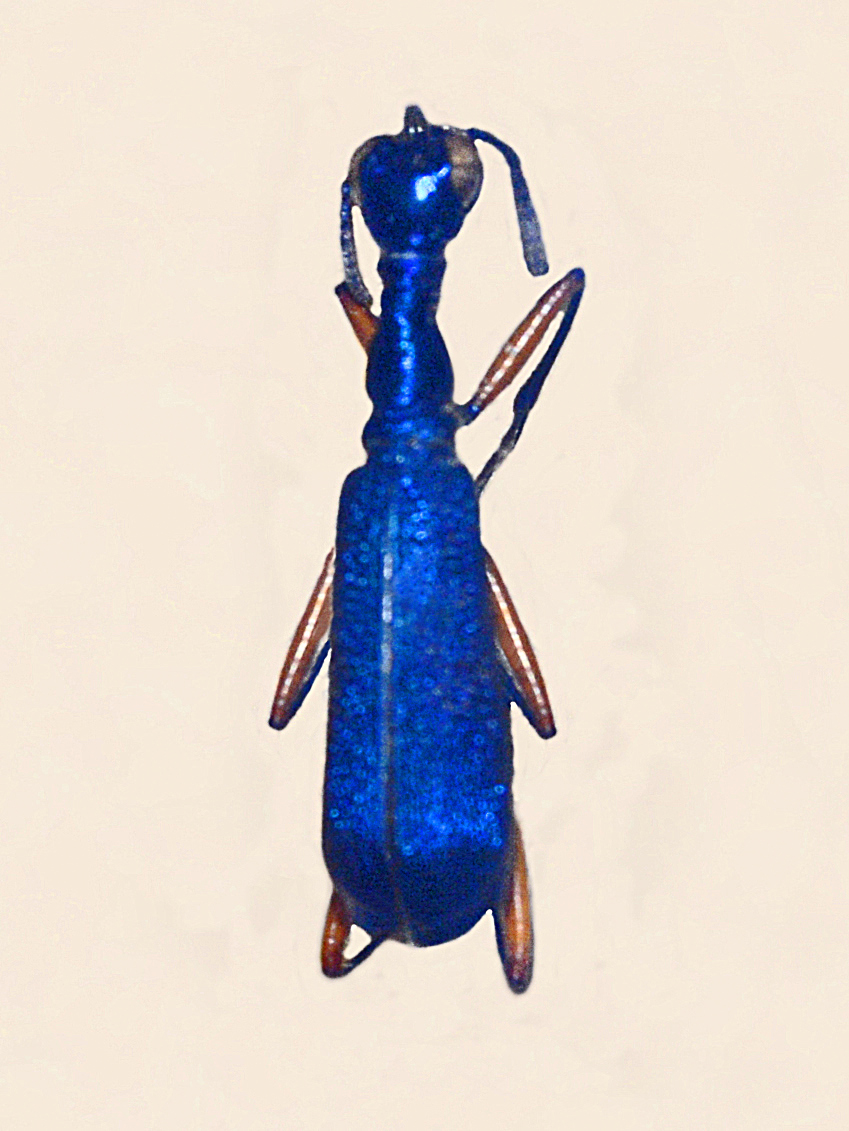
Neocollyris crassicornis

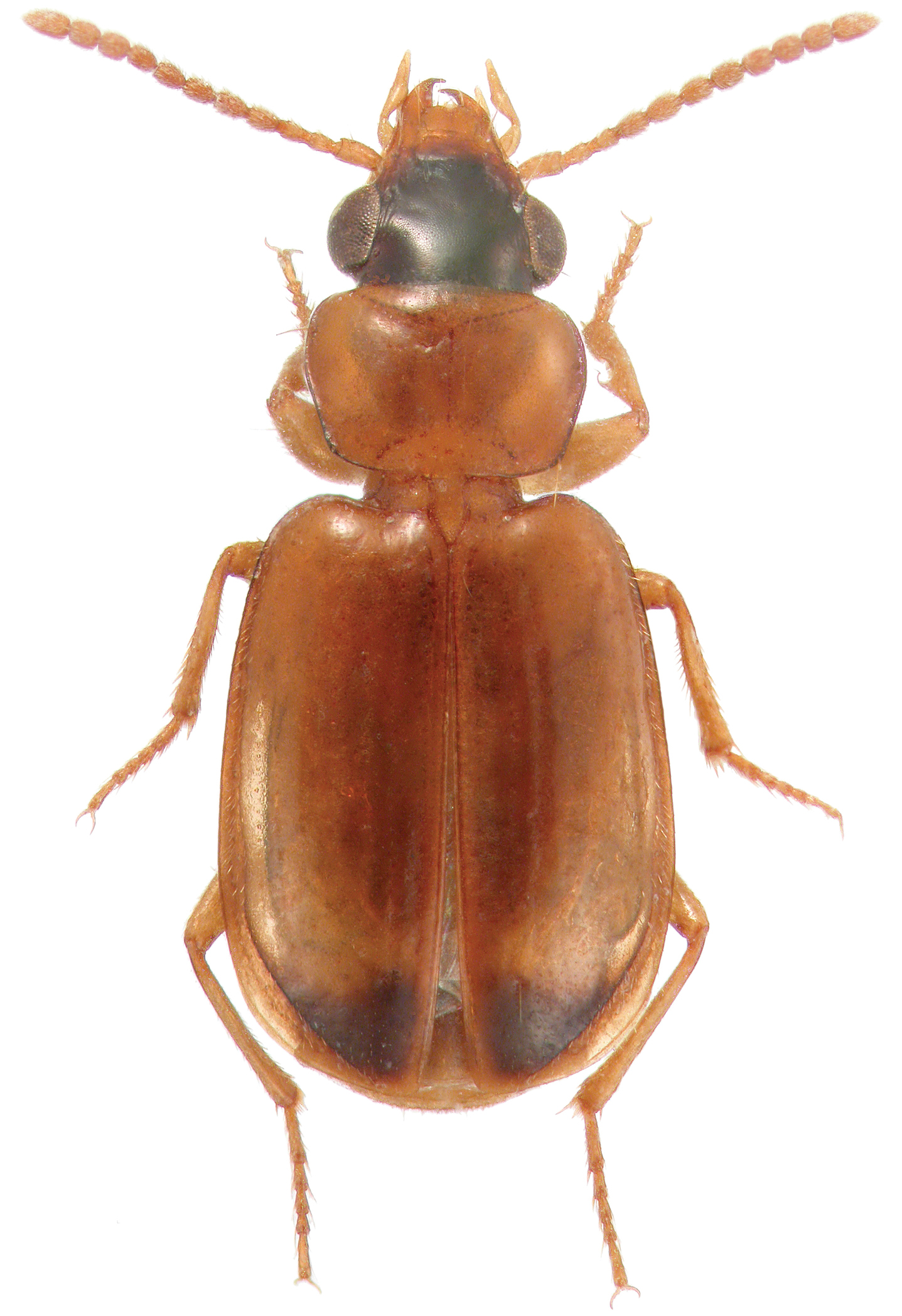
Perigona nigriceps

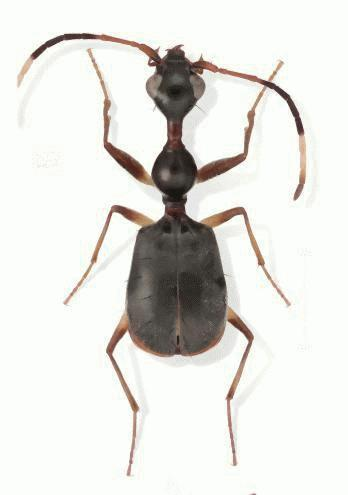
Selina westermanni

=== Family: Cerambycidae - Longhorn beetles ===
- Acalolepta griseoplagiata
- Acalolepta nivosa
- Acalolepta rusticatrix
- Acanthophorus serraticornis
- Aeolesthes holosericea
- Aeolesthes induta
- Amimes macilentus
- Anomophysis confusa
- Anomophysis crenata
- Anomophysis plagiata
- Anomophysis spinosa
- Anoplophora beryllina
- Apomecyna ceylonica
- Atimura dentipes
- Atimura proxima
- Bandar pascoei
- Baralipton dohrni
- Batocera davidis
- Batocera numitor
- Batocera rufomaculata
- Blepephaeus blairi
- Bostrychopsebium usurpator
- Callichromopsis telephoroides
- Callimetopoides albomaculatus
- Calothyrza sehestedtii
- Cantharocnemis downesii
- Cantharocnemis durantoni
- Capnolymma cingalensis
- Celosterna scabrator
- Centrotoclytus quadridens
- Ceresium elongatum
- Ceresium flavipes
- Ceresium gracile
- Ceresium longicorne
- Ceresium nilgiriense
- Ceresium rotundicolle
- Ceresium zeylanicum
- Ceylanoglaucytes kratzii
- Ceylanoglaucytes moesta
- Ceylanoparmena loebli
- Ceylanosybra baloghi
- Chelidonium argentatum
- Chinobrium vesculum
- Chloridolum trogoninum
- Chlorophorus abruptulus
- Chlorophorus annularis
- Chlorophorus cingalensis
- Chlorophorus melancholicus
- Chlorophorus moestus
- Chlorophorus sagittarius
- Cleonaria cingalensis
- Clytus ceylonicus
- Coptops aedificator
- Cyrtonops aterrima
- Demonax ascendens
- Demonax decorus
- Demonax divisus
- Demonax olemehli
- Demonax walkeri
- Dere apicaloides
- Dialeges undulatus
- Diorthus cinereus
- Dorysthenes rostratus
- Dubianella chrysogaster
- Dymasius macilentus
- Dymasius minor
- Dymasius turgidulus
- Egesina aspera
- Egesina ceylonensis
- Egesina sericans
- Epania cingalensis
- Epepeotes commixtus
- Eucomatocera vittata
- Eunidia ceylanica
- Eunidia discovittata
- Eunidia mehli
- Eunidia opima
- Exocentrus aculeatus
- Exocentrus ceylanicus
- Exocentrus exocentroides
- Exocentrus ficicola
- Exocentrus fortifer
- Exocentrus mehli
- Exocentrus pellitus
- Exocentrus pubescens
- Exocentrus sparsutus
- Falsomesosella ceylonica
- Gelonaetha hirta
- Glenea arithmetica
- Glenea cancellata
- Glenea ceylonica
- Glenea commissa
- Glenea duodecimplagiata
- Glenea quadrimaculata
- Glenea scapifera
- Glenea socia
- Gnatholea simplex
- Gyaritus indicus
- Halme cinctella
- Haplopsebium kolibaci
- Homalomelas gracilipes
- Homalomelas quadridentatus
- Homalomelas zonatus
- Inermoparmena besucheti
- Leptepania filiformis
- Macrochenus tigrinus
- Massicus venustus
- Megopis terminalis
- Merionoeda taprobanica
- Mesosa columba
- Mesosa indica
- Mesosa rosa
- Micropraonetha carinipennis
- Mimepilysta compacta
- Mimosciadella fuscosignata
- Mispila albosignata
- Moechohecyra verrucicollis
- Moechotypa ceylonica
- Molorchus taprobanicus
- Mulciber strandi
- Neocerambyx opulentus
- Neoplocaederus consocius
- Neoplocaederus ferrugineus
- Neoplocaederus obesus
- Neosybra ropicoides
- Nepiodes terminalis
- Niphona malaccensis
- Notomulciber bryanti
- Notomulciber strandi
- Nupserha ceylonica
- Nupserha vexator
- Nyphasia torrida
- Oberea ceylonica
- Oberea kanarensis
- Oberea kandyana
- Oberea lutea
- Obereopsis flaveola
- Olenecamptus bilobus
- Pachylocerus crassicornis
- Pachyteria calumniata
- Pachyteria fasciata
- Paradihammus ceylonicus
- Paradystus ceylonicus
- Paraleprodera crucifera
- Paramimistena duplicata
- Paranandra ceylonica
- Parorsidis ceylanica
- Pentheopraonetha latifrons
- Perissus myops
- Perissus parvulus
- Pharsalia patrona
- Pharsalia proxima
- Phelipara moringae
- Polyzonus tetraspilotus
- Pothyne ceylonensis
- Prionomma atratum
- Pseudaristobia octofasciculata
- Pseudocalamobius ceylonensis
- Pseudocentruropsis flavosignata
- Pterolophia bigibbera
- Pterolophia ceylonensis
- Pterolophia ceylonica
- Pterolophia convexa
- Pterolophia dohrni
- Pterolophia fusca
- Pterolophia incerta
- Pterolophia insulicola
- Pterolophia parovalis
- Pterolophia tuberculatrix
- Purpuricenus sanguinolentus
- Rhaphipodus taprobanicus
- Rhaphuma elegantula
- Rhaphuma teres
- Ropica ceylonica
- Ropica signata
- Scalenus singalensis
- Sciades ceylanicus
- Sebasmia templetoni
- Sebasmia testacea
- Serixia ceylonica
- Serixia histrio
- Serixia proxima
- Setoparmena mussardi
- Similosodus venosus
- Sophronica ceylanica
- Spinimegopis cingalensis
- Spinimegopis morettoi
- Spinopraonetha fuscomaculata
- Stenhomalus lateralis
- Stenhomalus y-pallidum
- Sthenias maculiceps
- Stromatium barbatum
- Sybra albisparsa
- Sybra apomecynoides
- Sybra citrina
- Sybra fuscosuturalis
- Sybra oblongipennis
- Sybra praeusta
- Sybra pseudosignata
- Sybra quadrimaculata
- Sybra signatoides
- Tetraglenes ceylonensis
- Tetraommatus filiformis
- Tetraommatus muticus
- Therippia affinis
- Therippia decorata
- Therippia mediofasciata
- Therippia signata
- Therippia triloba
- Thranius gibbosus
- Tricholophia ceylonica
- Xoanodera amoena
- Xylorhiza adusta
- Xylotrechus carenifrons
- Xylotrechus carinifrons
- Xylotrechus subscutellatus
- Xystrocera globosa
- Yimnashana ceylonica
- Zonopteroides diversus
- Zonopterus redemanni
- Zoodes eburioides
- Zoodes maculatus
- Zotalemimon procerum
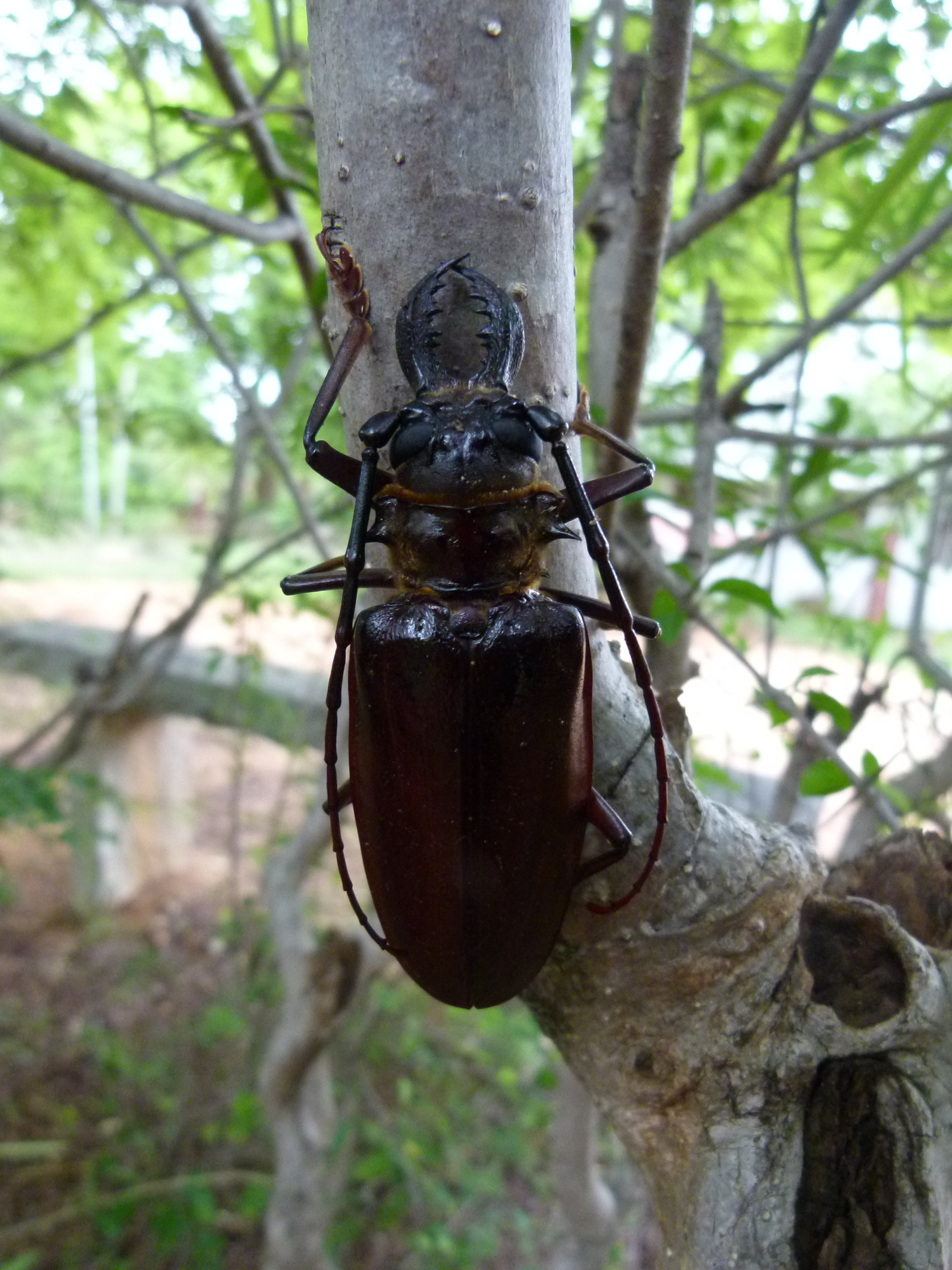
Acanthophorus serraticornis

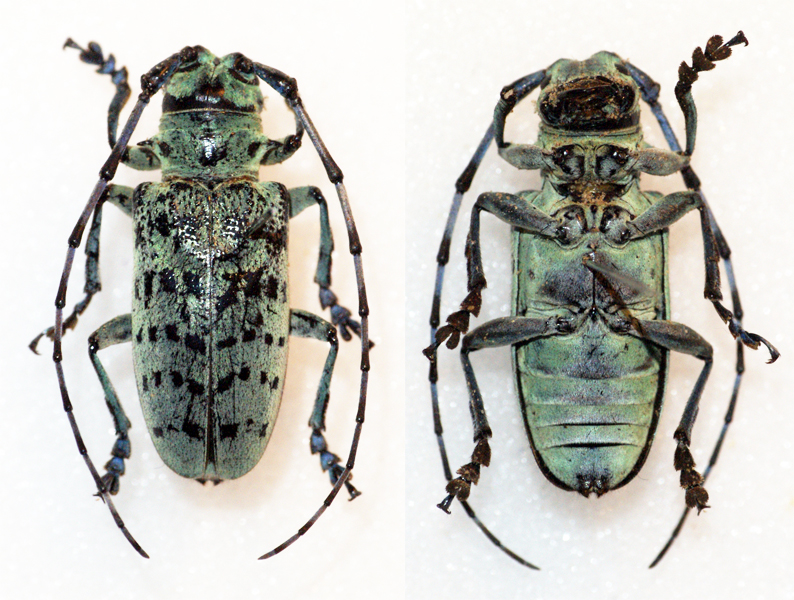
Anoplophora beryllina

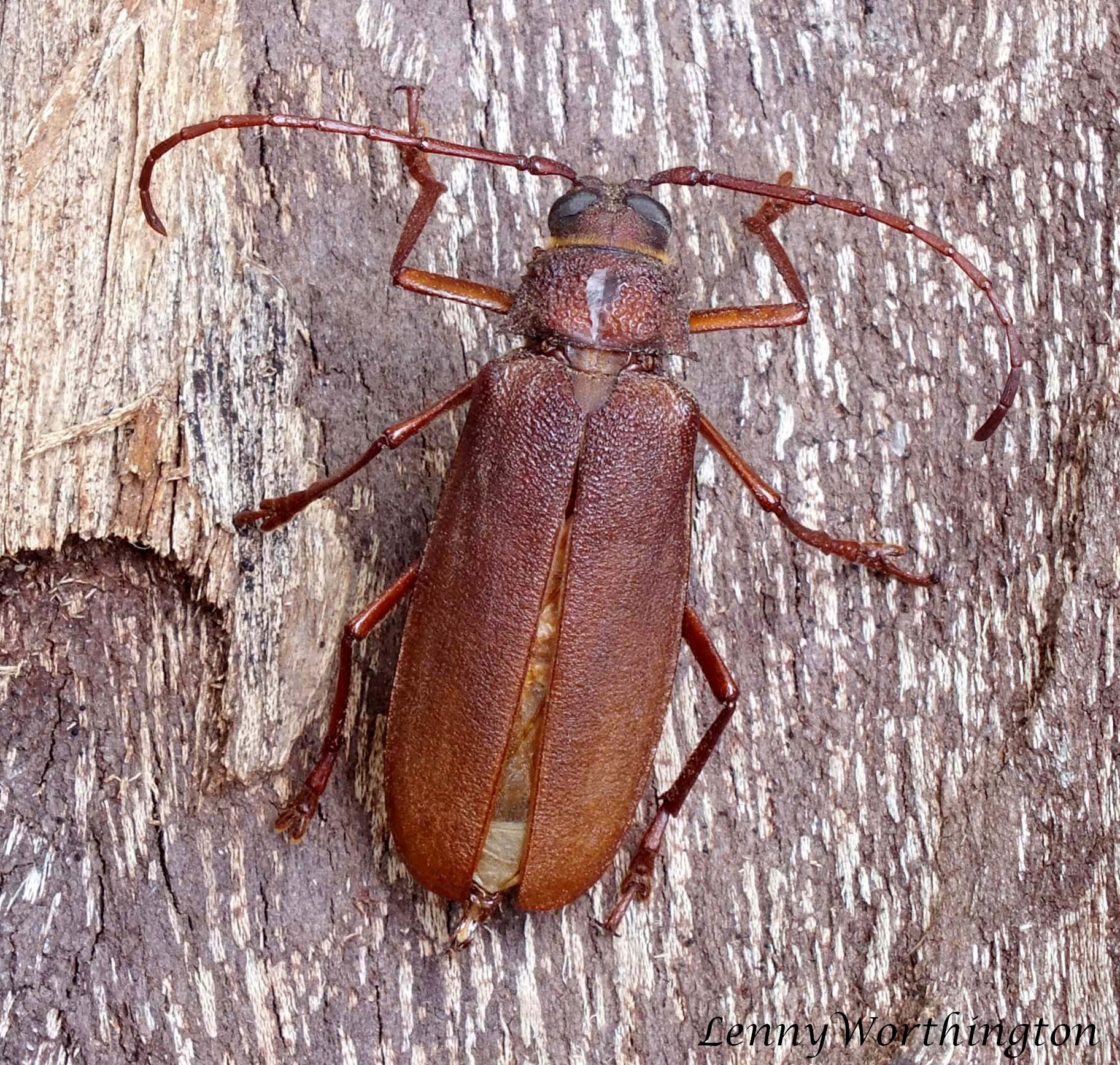
Bandar pascoei

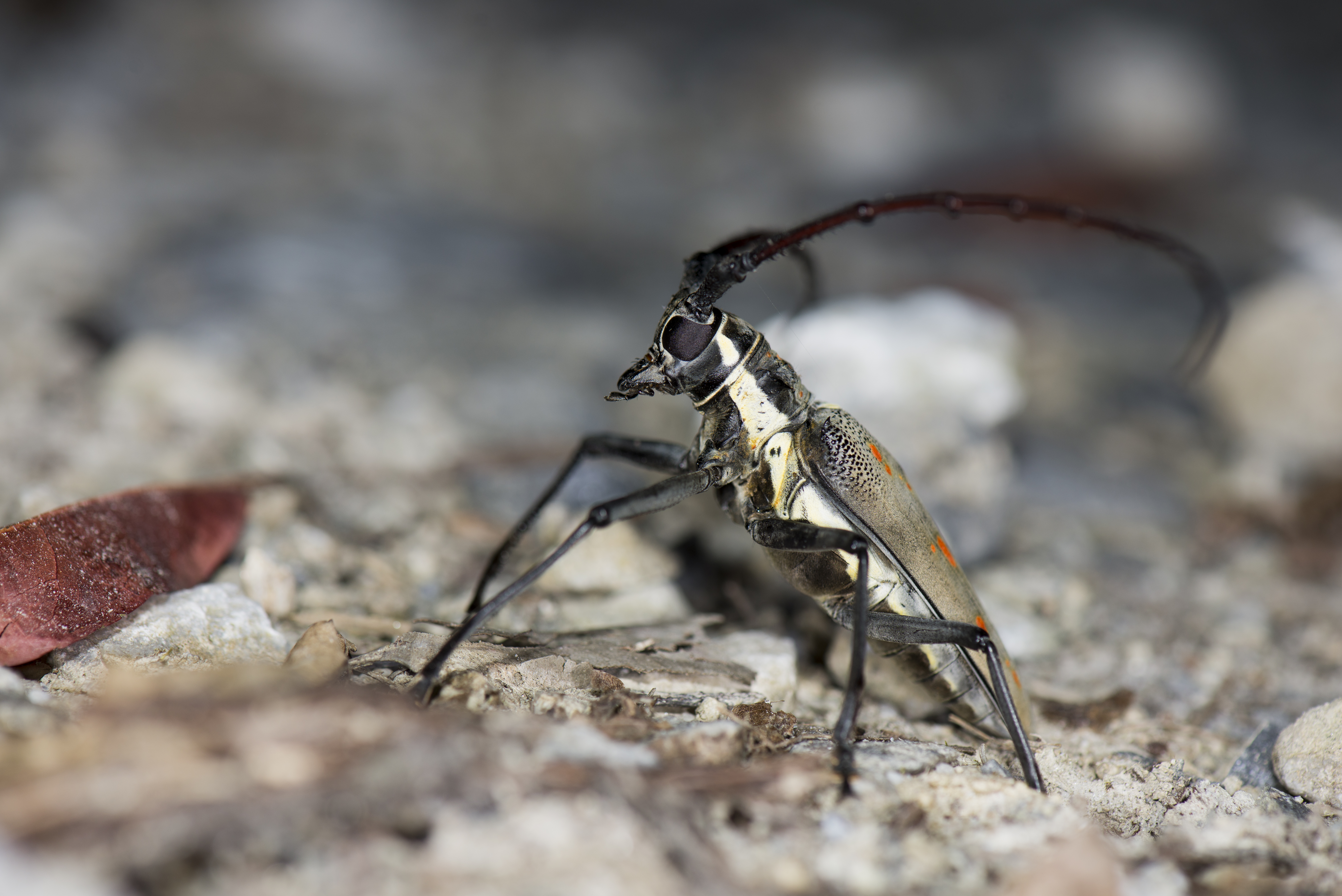
Batocera davidis

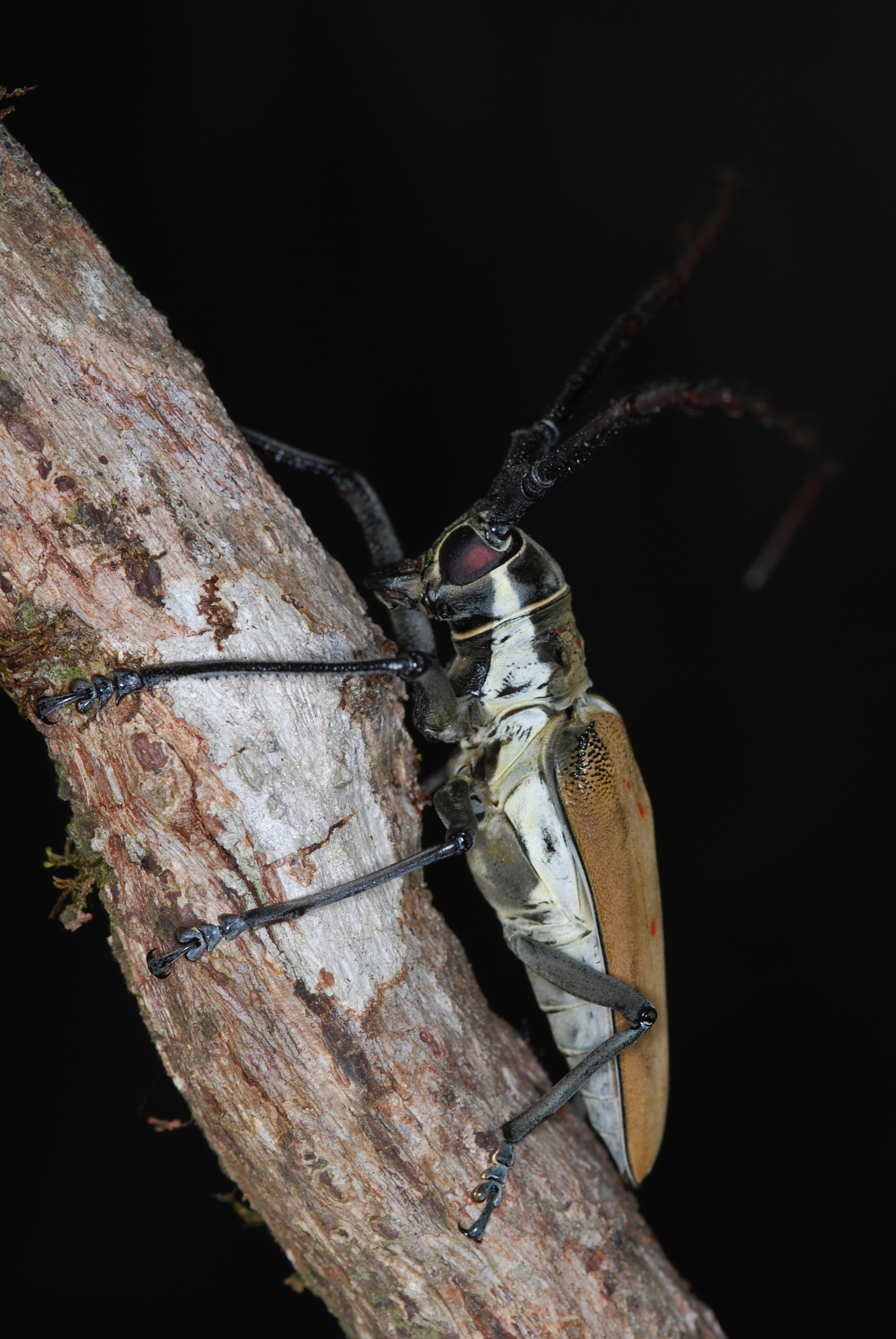
Batocera numitor

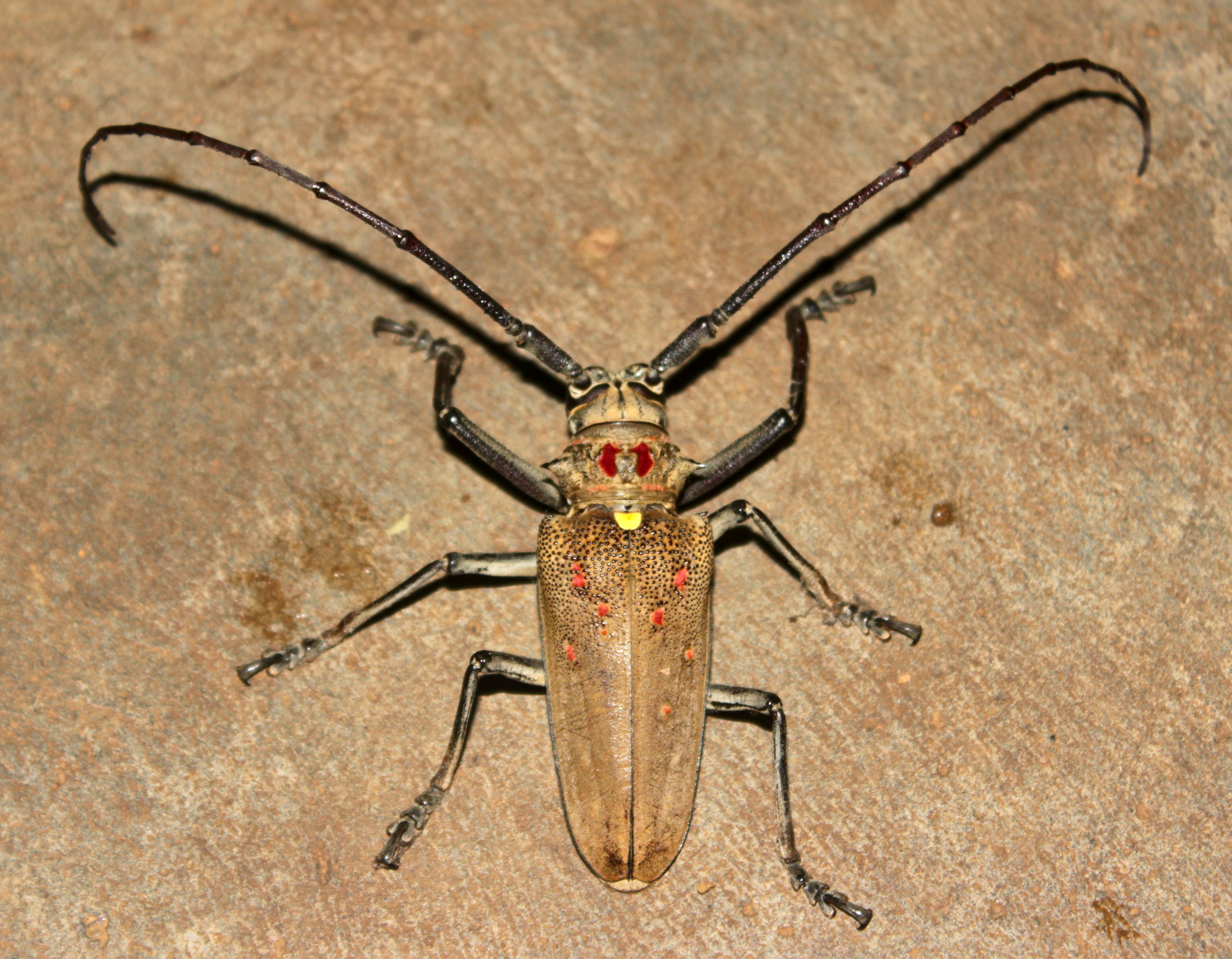
Batocera rufomaculata

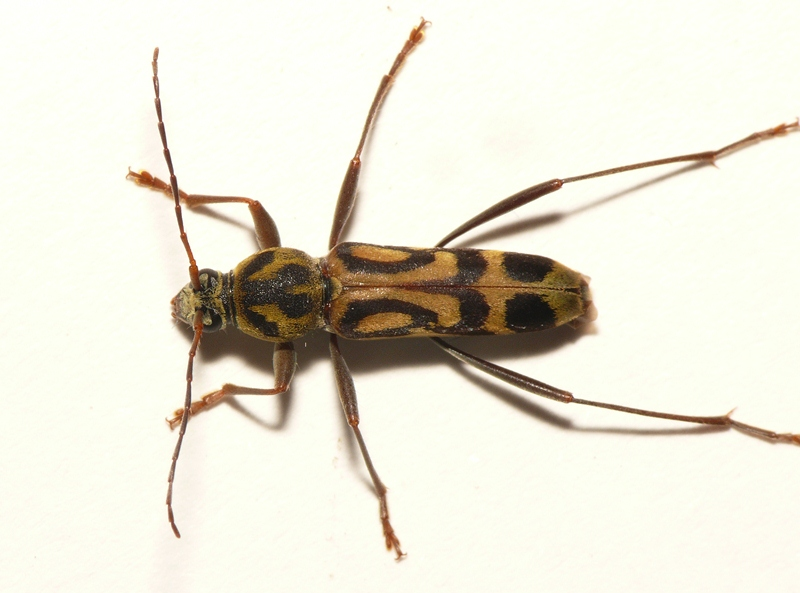
Chlorophorus annularis

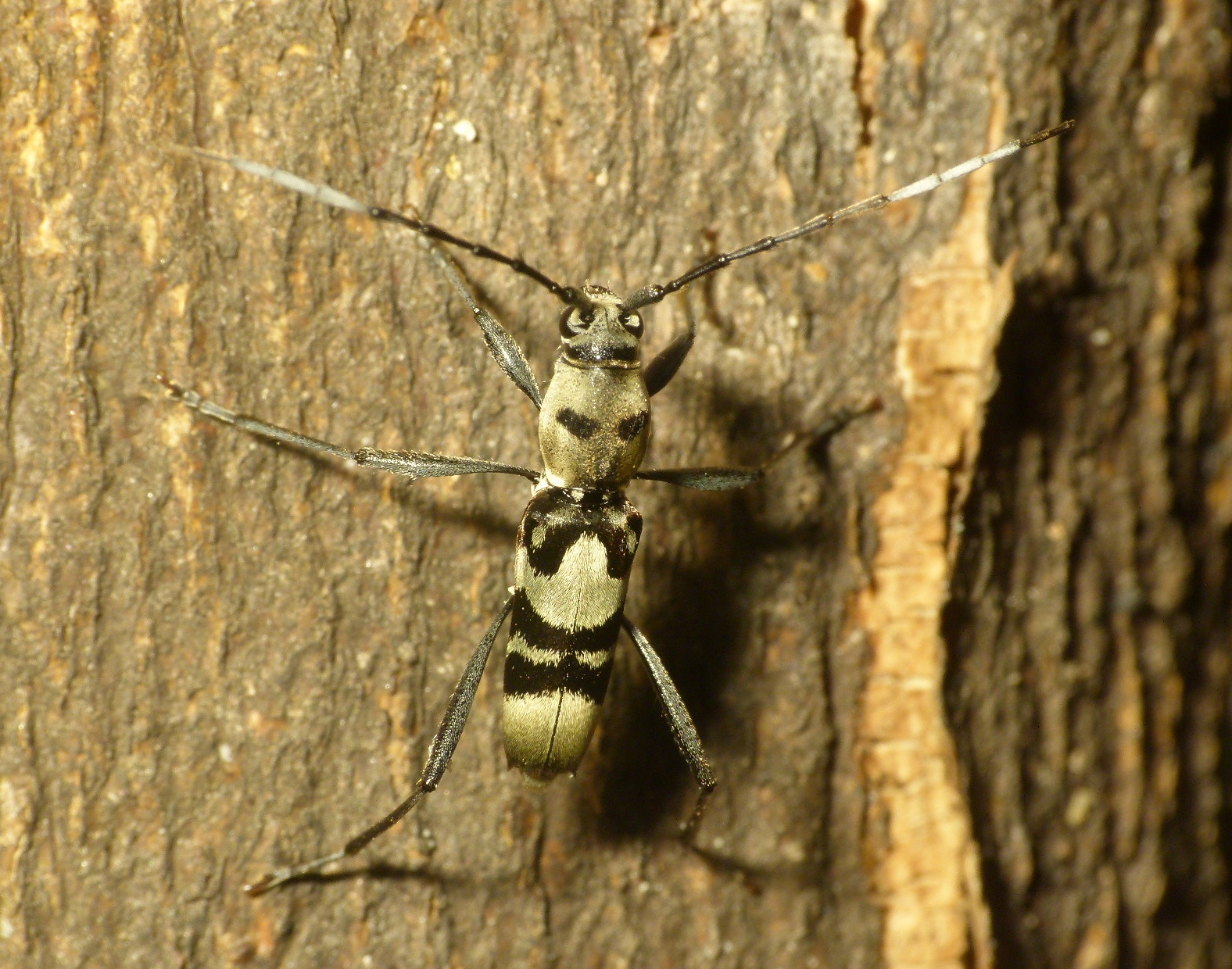
Demonax decorus

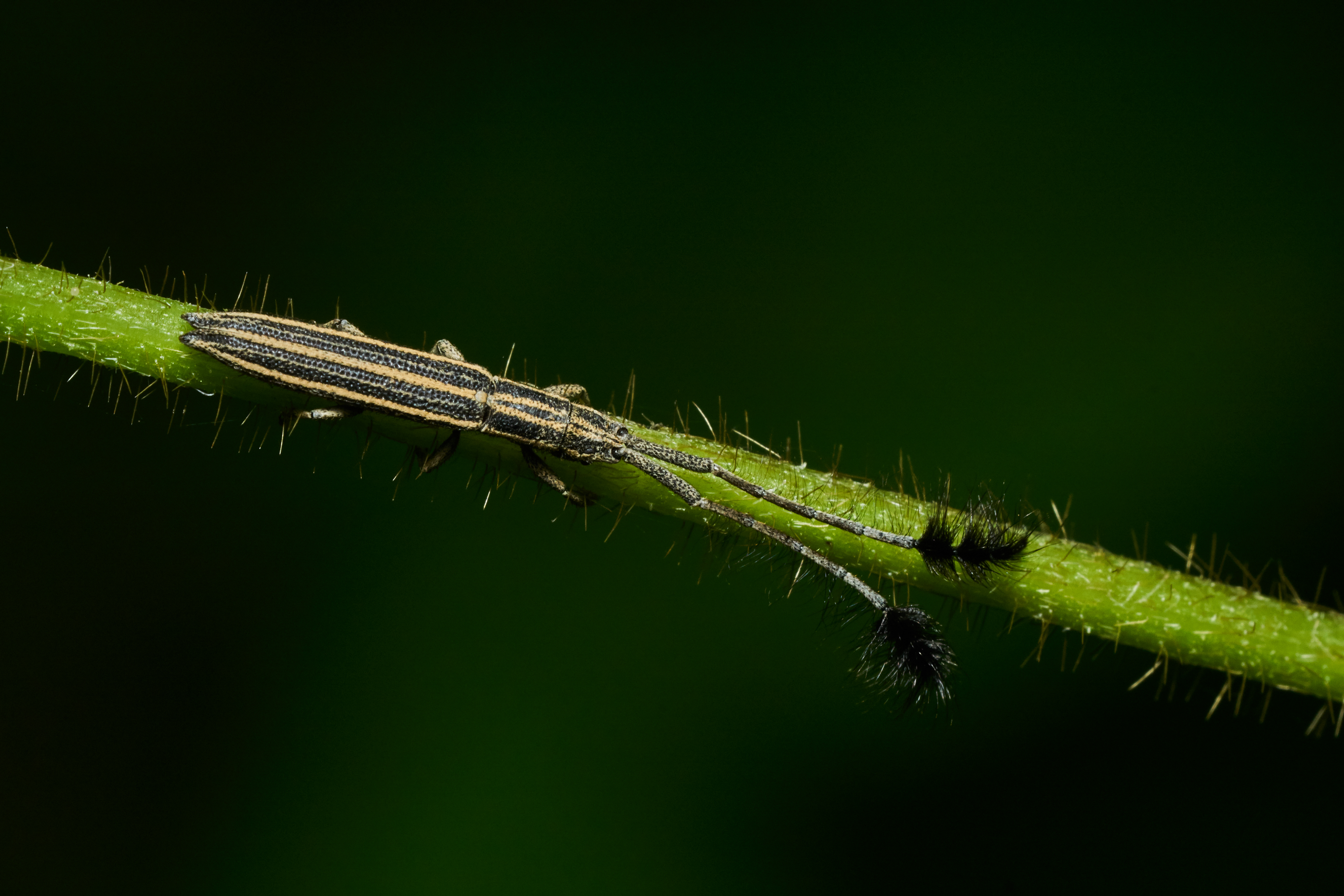
Eucomatocera vittata

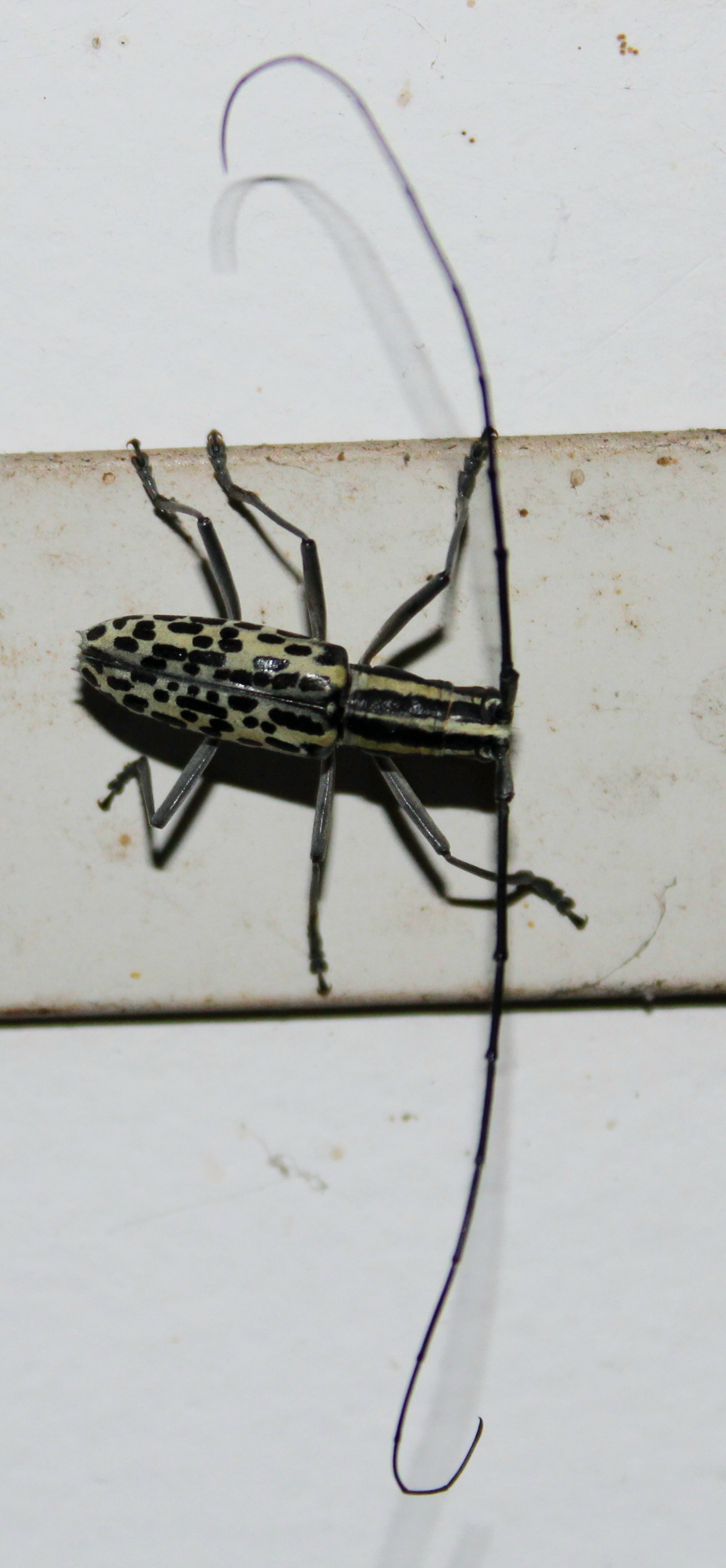
Macrochenus tigrinus

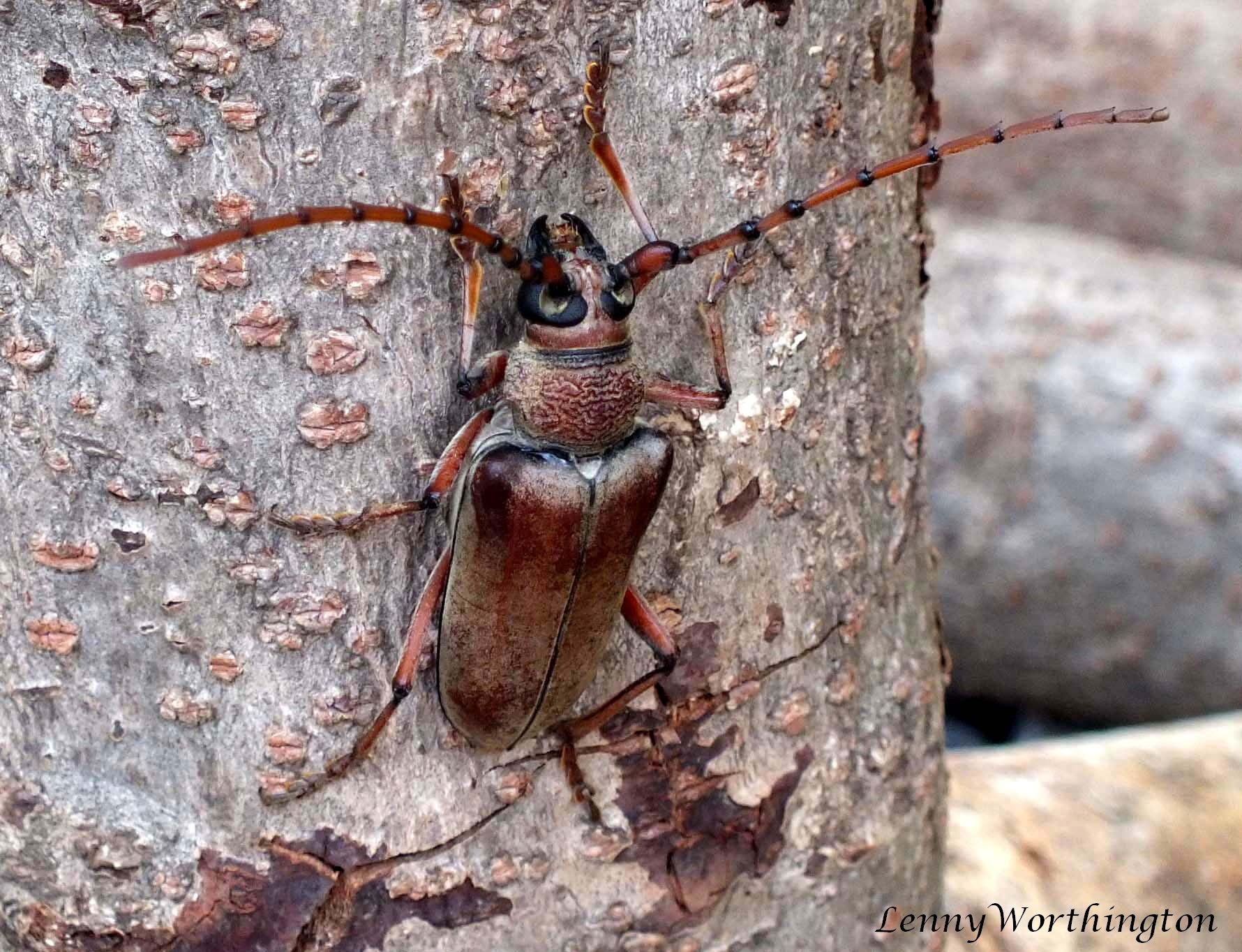
Neoplocaederus obesus

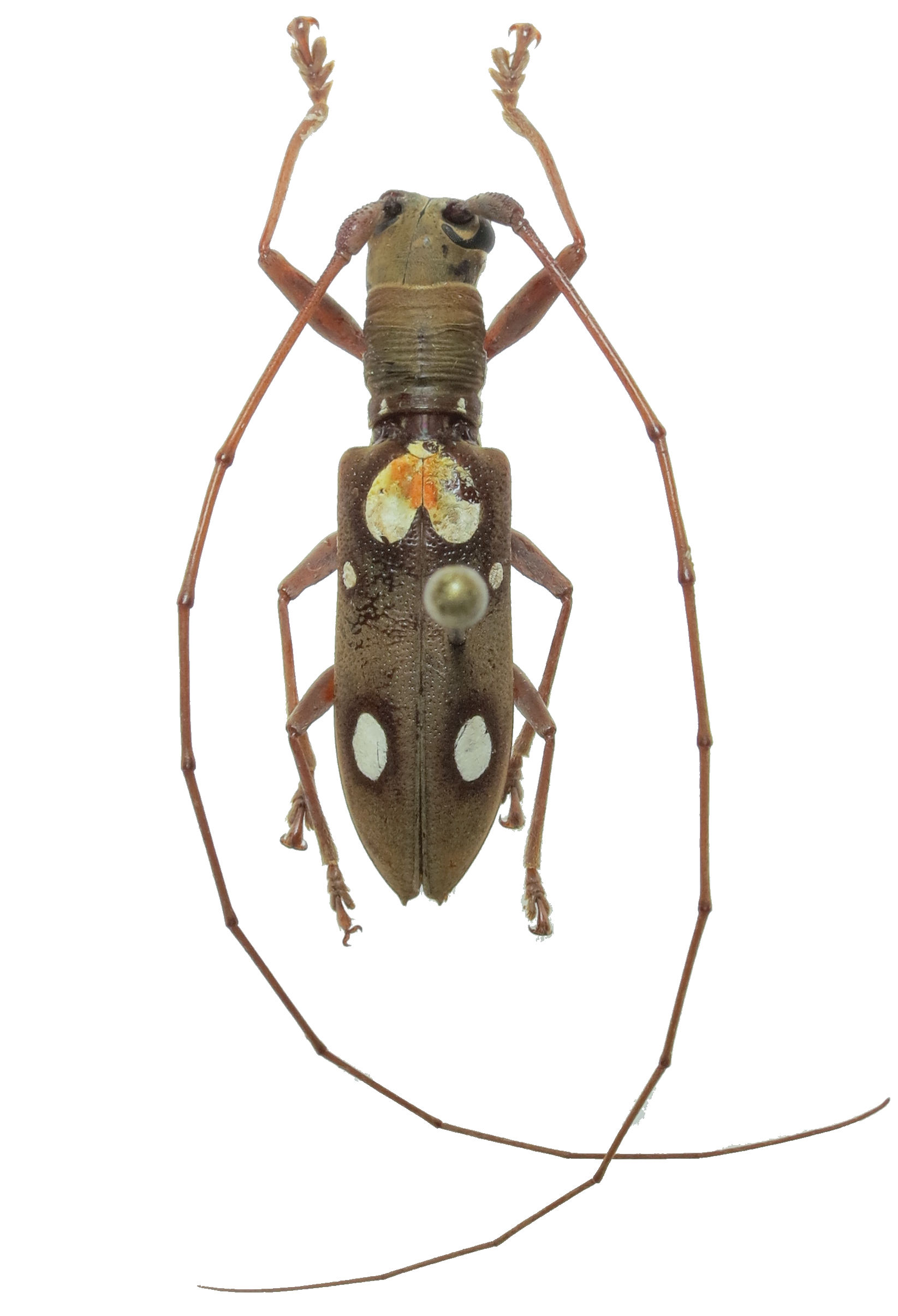
Olenecamptus bilobus

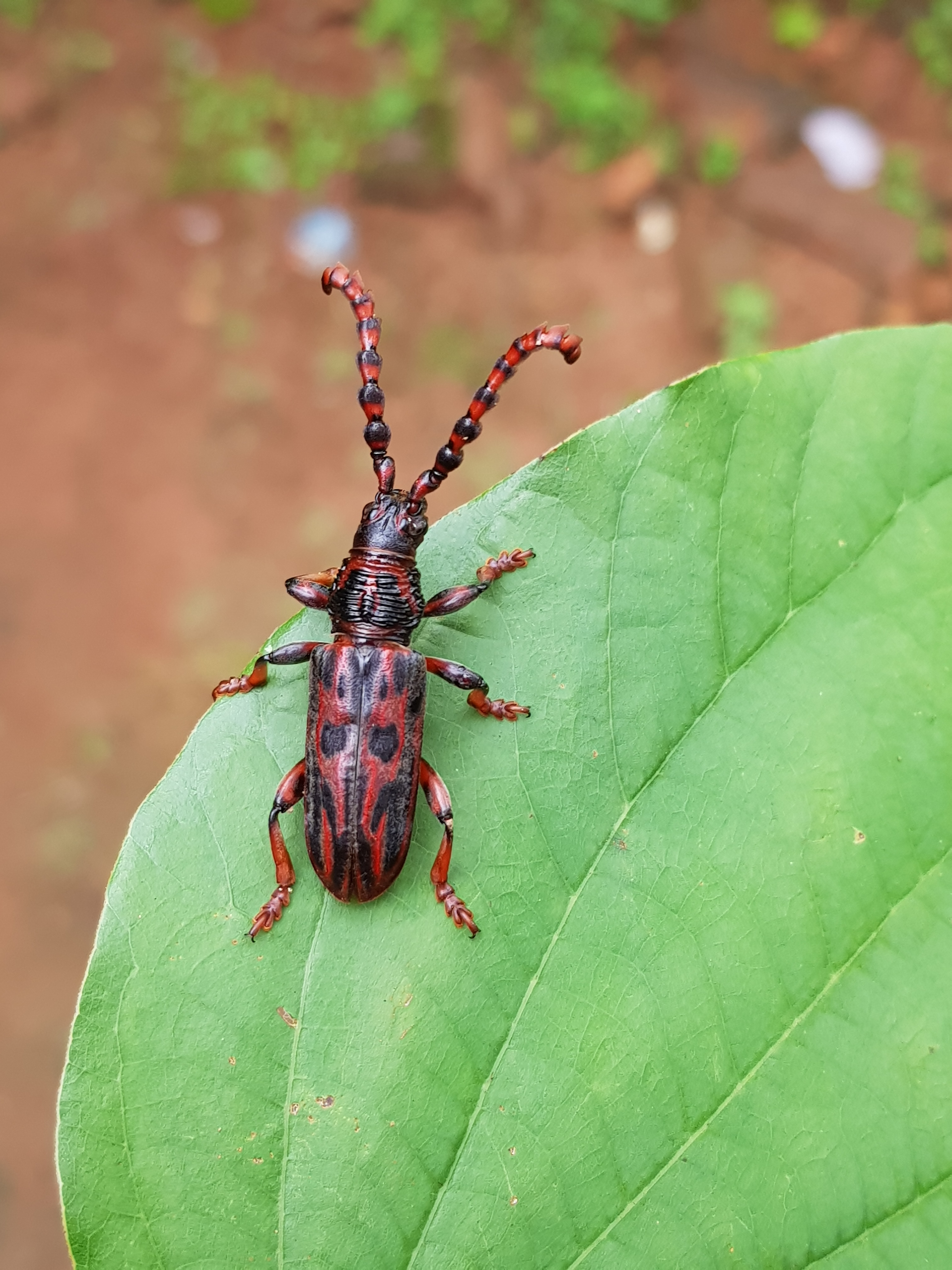
Pachylocerus crassicornis

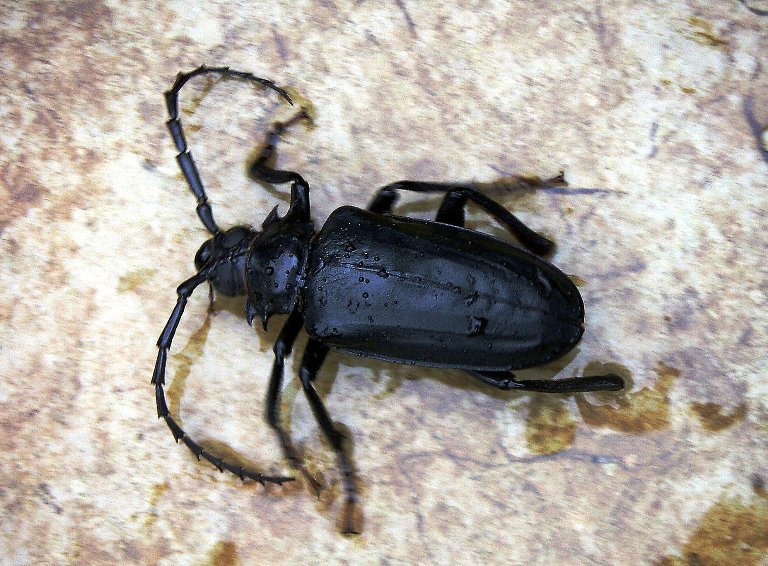
Prionomma atratum

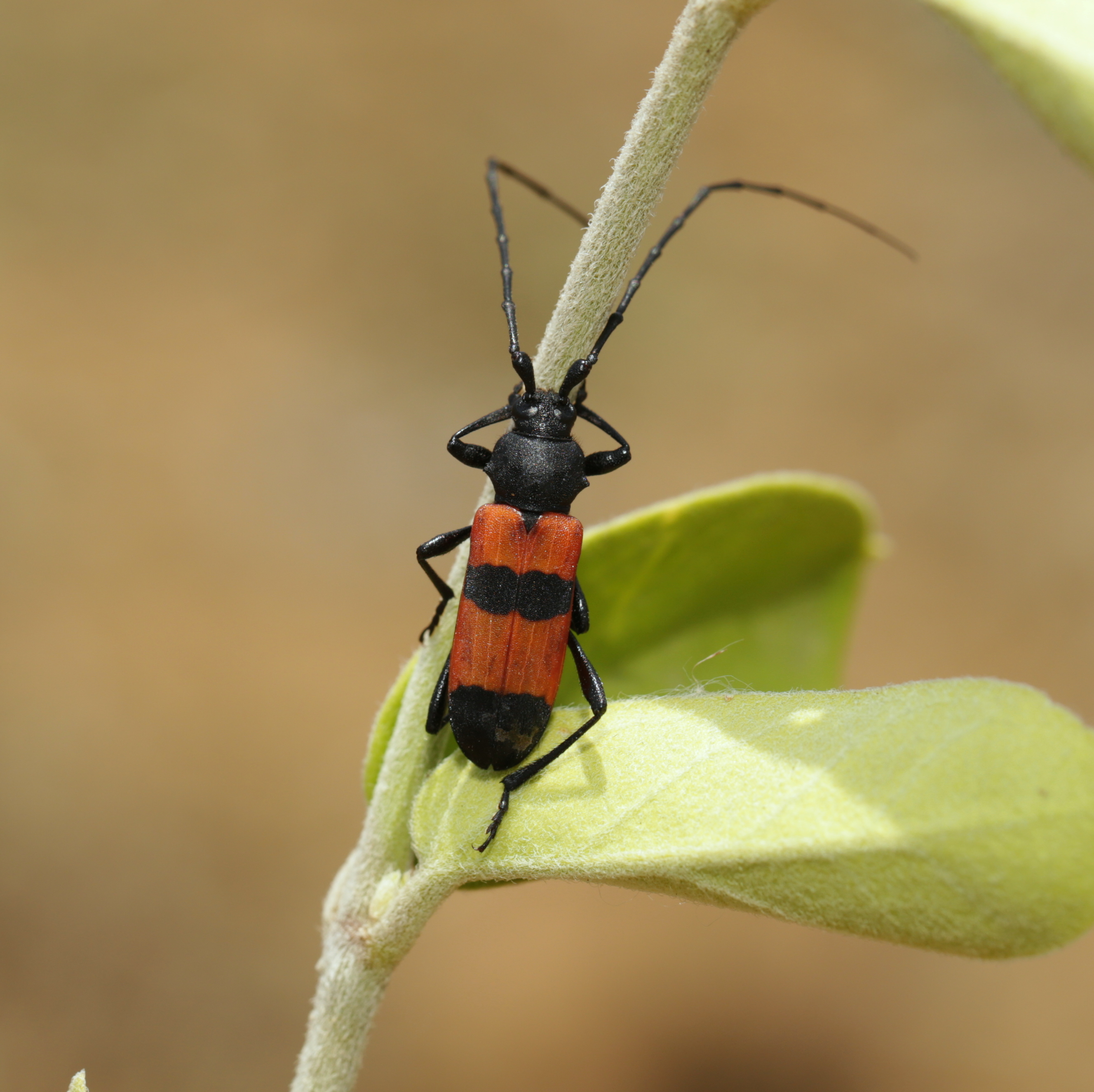
Purpuricenus sanguinolentus

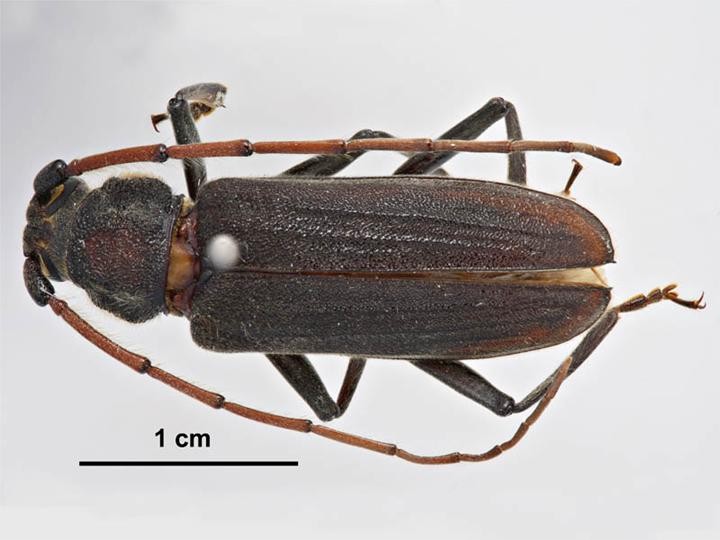
Stromatium barbatum

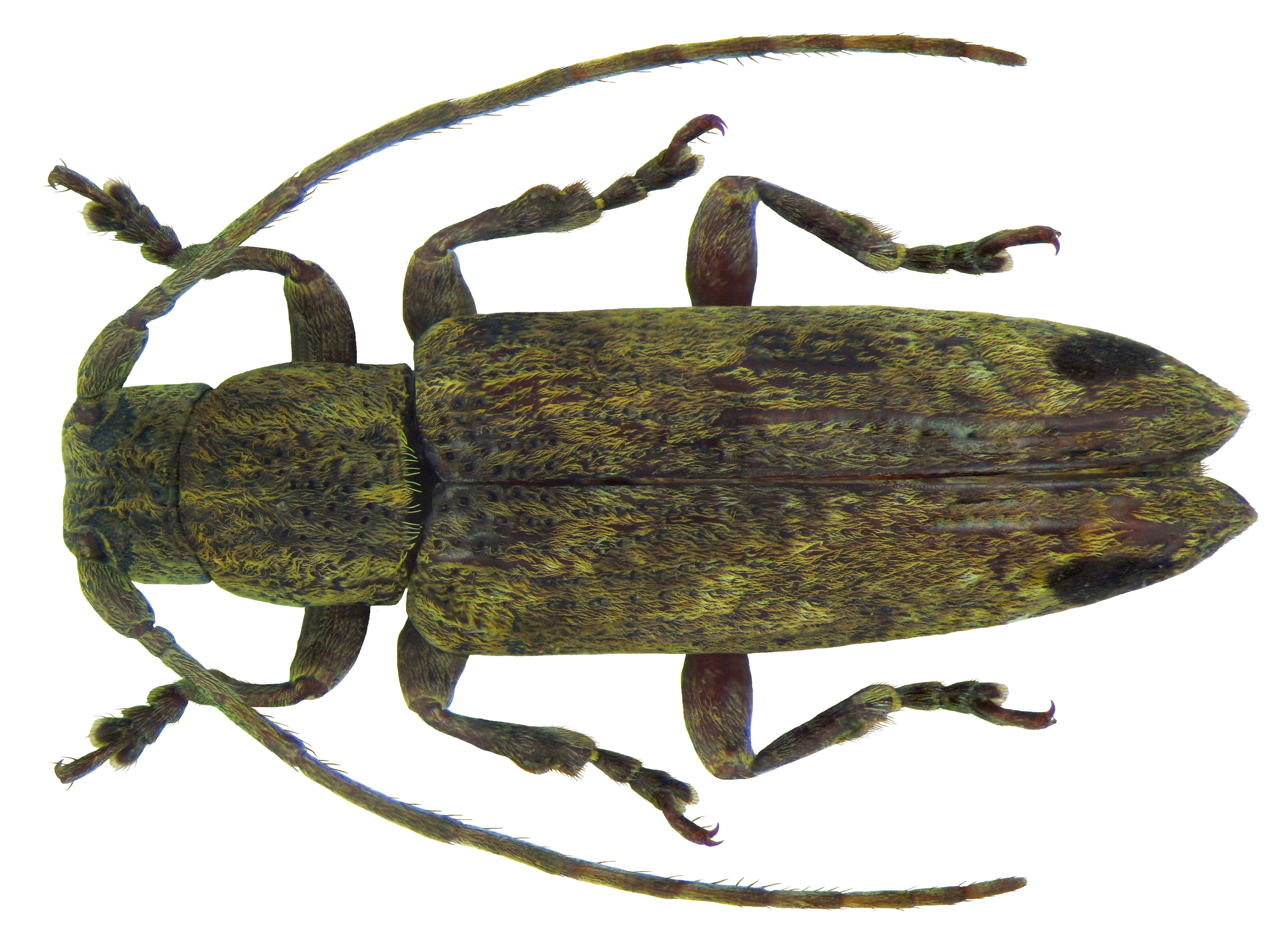
Sybra praeusta

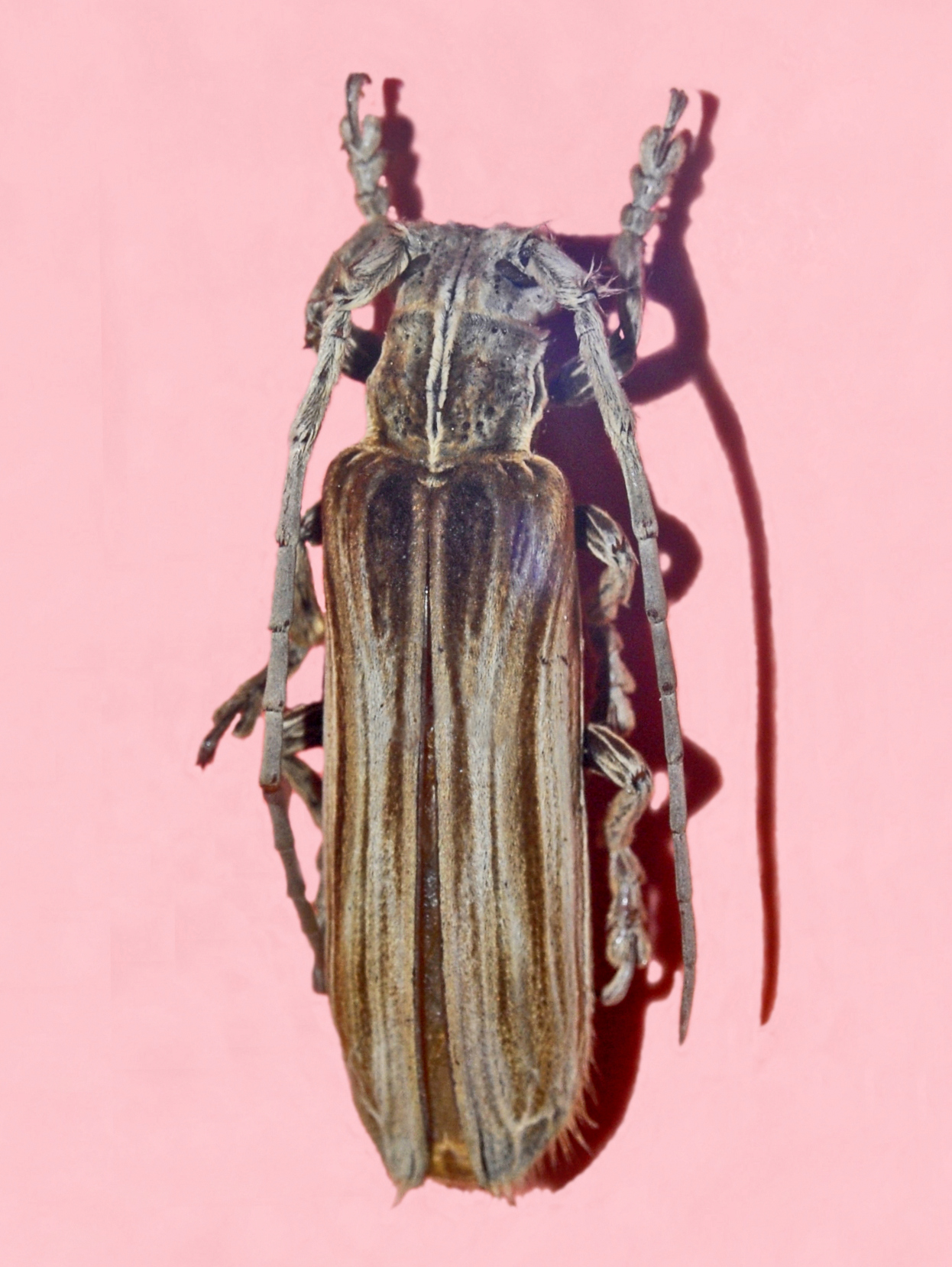
Xylorhiza adusta

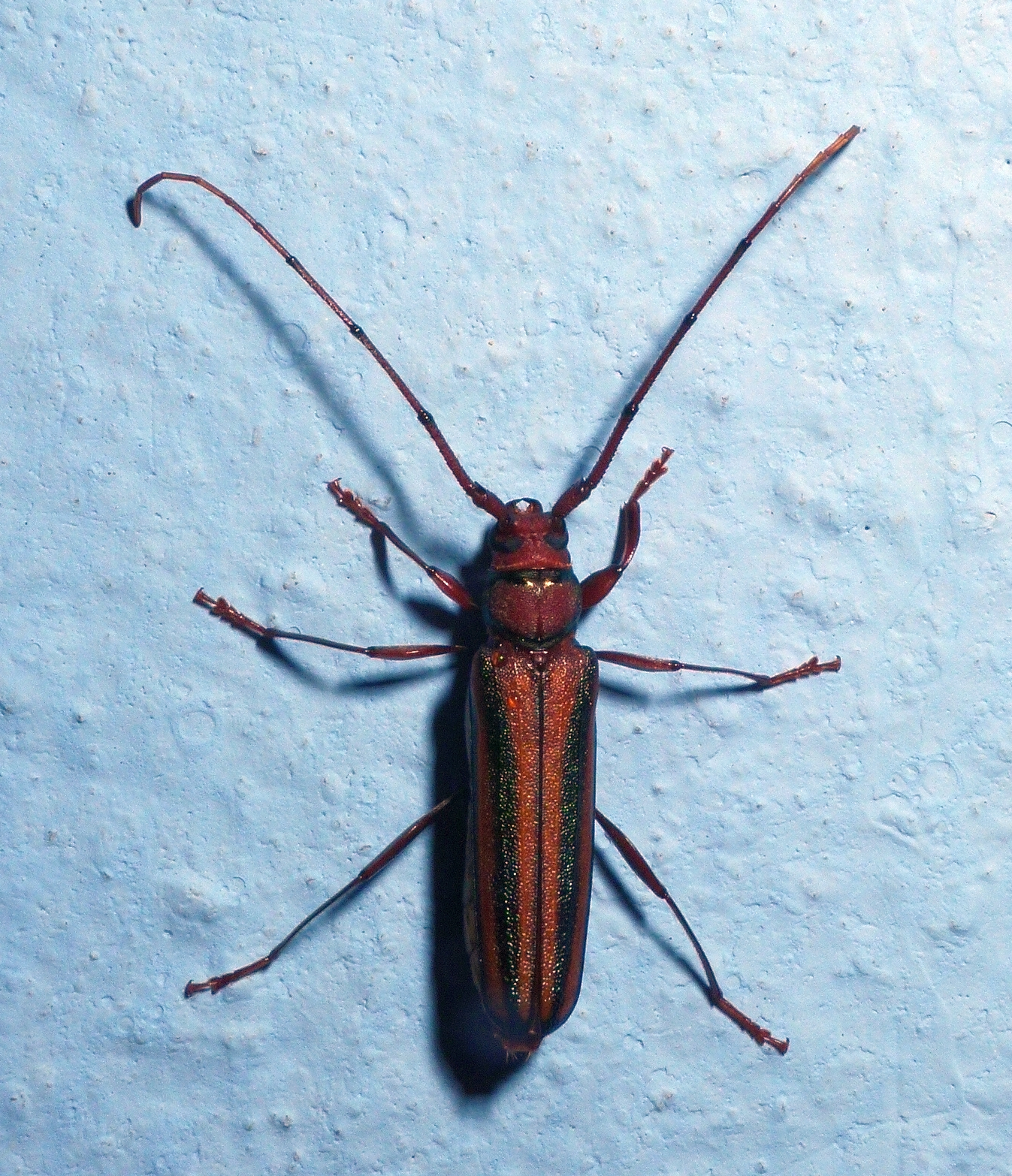
Xystrocera globosa

=== Family: Cerylonidae - Minute bark beetles ===
- Axiocerylon brincki
- Cerylon gracilipes
- Cerylon quadricolle
- Cerylon tibiale
- Cerylon unicolor
- Ectomicrus aper
- Ectomicrus setosus
- Metaxestus bicolor
- Monotoma longicollis
- Murmidius bifasciatus
- Neolapethus orientalis
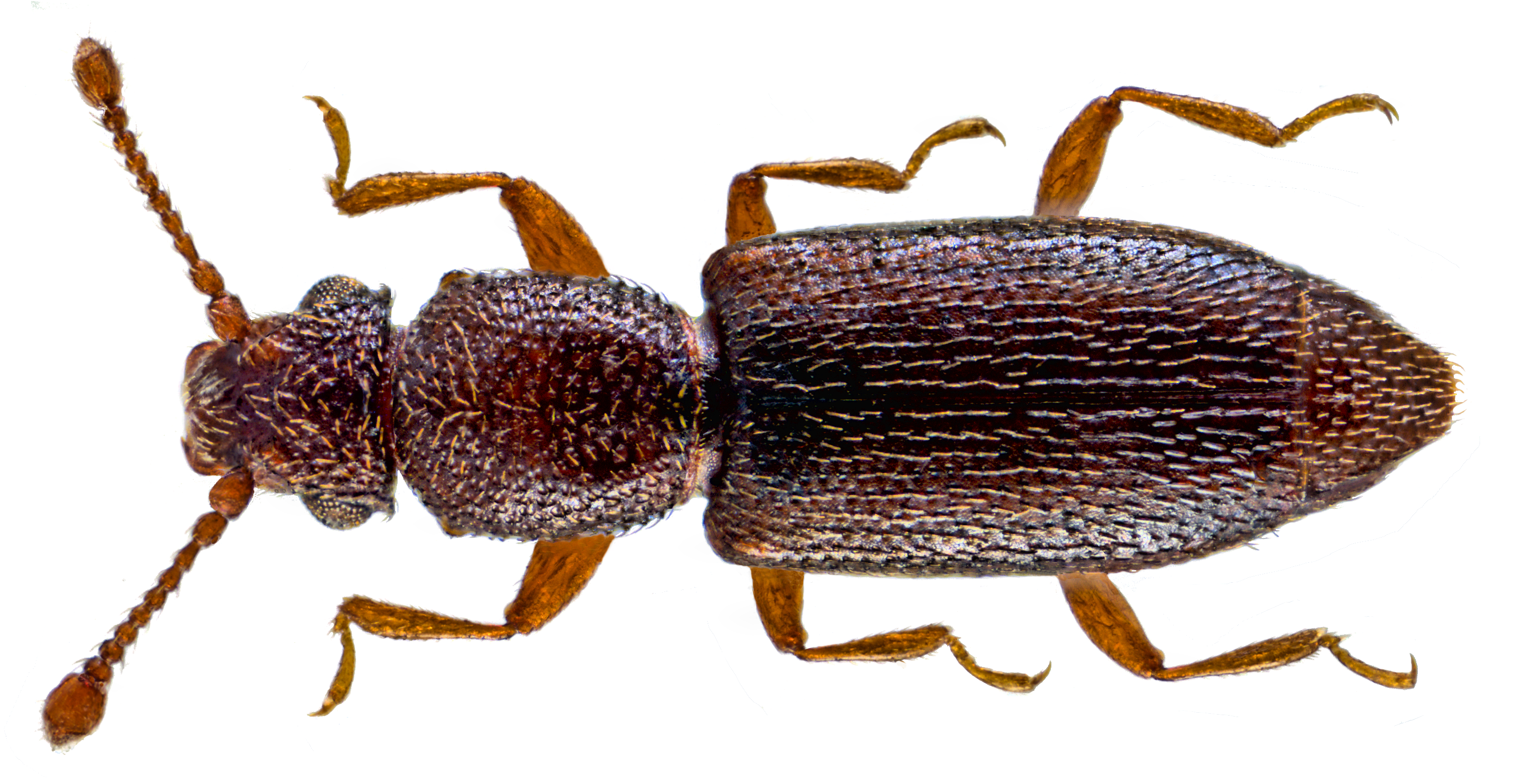
Monotoma longicollis

=== Family: Chrysomelidae - Leaf beetles ===
- Agonita apicipennis
- Amblispa dohrnii
- Amblispa laevigata
- Anisodera guerini
- Aspidimorpha dorsata
- Aspidimorpha furcata
- Aspidimorpha lobata
- Aspidolopha melanophthalma
- Brontispa longissima
- Bruchidius anderssoni
- Bruchidius brincki
- Bruchidius cingalicus
- Bruchidius mendosus
- Bruchidius nalandus
- Callispa brevipes
- Callispa fulvonigra
- Callispa krishnashunda
- Callispa minima
- Callispa nigricornis
- Callispa nigritarsata
- Callispa pita
- Callosobruchus bicalcaratus
- Callosobruchus chinensis
- Callosobruchus gibbicollis
- Callosobruchus nigripennis
- Caryedon serratus
- Cassida ceylonica
- Cassida circumdata
- Cassida cognobilis
- Cassida dorsonotata
- Cassida imbecilla
- Cassida obtusata
- Chiridopsis bipunctata
- Chiridopsis marginata
- Crioceris hampsoni
- Dactylispa albopilosa
- Dactylispa ceylonica
- Dactylispa feae
- Dactylispa fulvipes
- Dactylispa haeckelii
- Dactylispa horni
- Dactylispa insignita
- Dactylispa lankaja
- Dactylispa tissa
- Decellebruchus walkeri
- Dicladispa arebiana
- Downesia ceylonica
- Epistictina reicheana
- Epitrix lomasa
- Estigmena chinensis
- Eutornus jansoni
- Galerucella placida
- Gonophora nigricauda
- Hispa andrewesi
- Hispa ramosa
- Hispellinus minor
- Hispellinus perotetii
- Laccoptera quatuordecimnotata
- Leptispa latifrons
- Leptispa pygmaea
- Leptispa samkirna
- Lilioceris foveipennis
- Lilioceris impressa
- Longitarsus allotrophus
- Longitarsus angelikae
- Medythia suturalis
- Micrispa zinzibaris
- Monolepta cognata
- Monolepta descripta
- Monolepta juno
- Monolepta oculata
- Monolepta sexlineata
- Notosacantha vicaria
- Oncocephala quadrilobata
- Phola octodecimguttata
- Platycorynus peregrinus
- Platypria echidna
- Platypria erinaceus
- Platypria hystrix
- Promecotheca cumingii
- Rhodtrispa dilaticornis
- Sagra femorata
- Sceloenopla octopunctata
- Silana farinosa
- Spermophagus aeneipennis
- Spermophagus albosparsus
- Spermophagus cederholmi
- Spermophagus mannarensis
- Spermophagus niger
- Spermophagus perpastus
- Spermophagus pfaffenbergeri
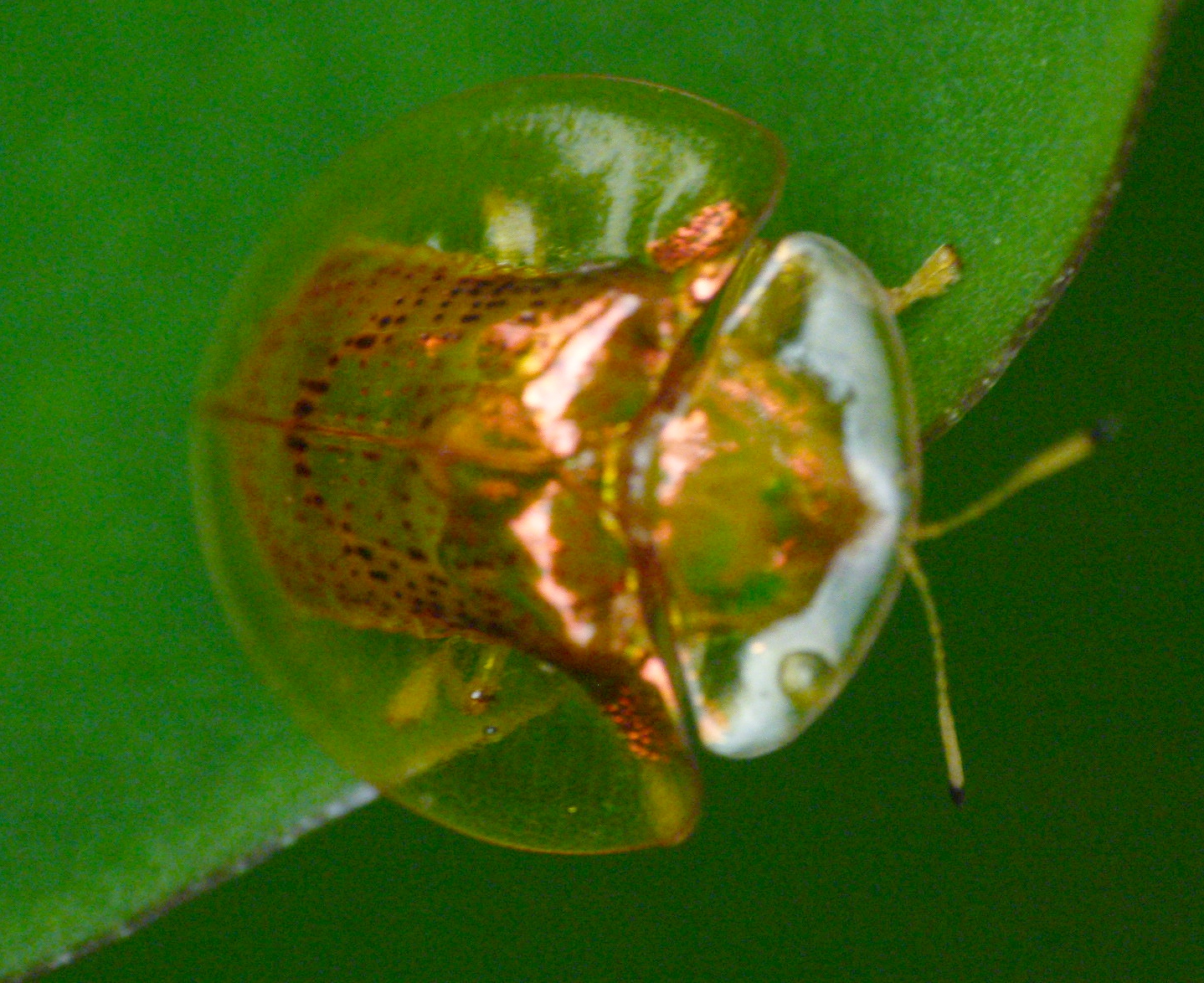
Aspidimorpha furcata

Brontispa longissima

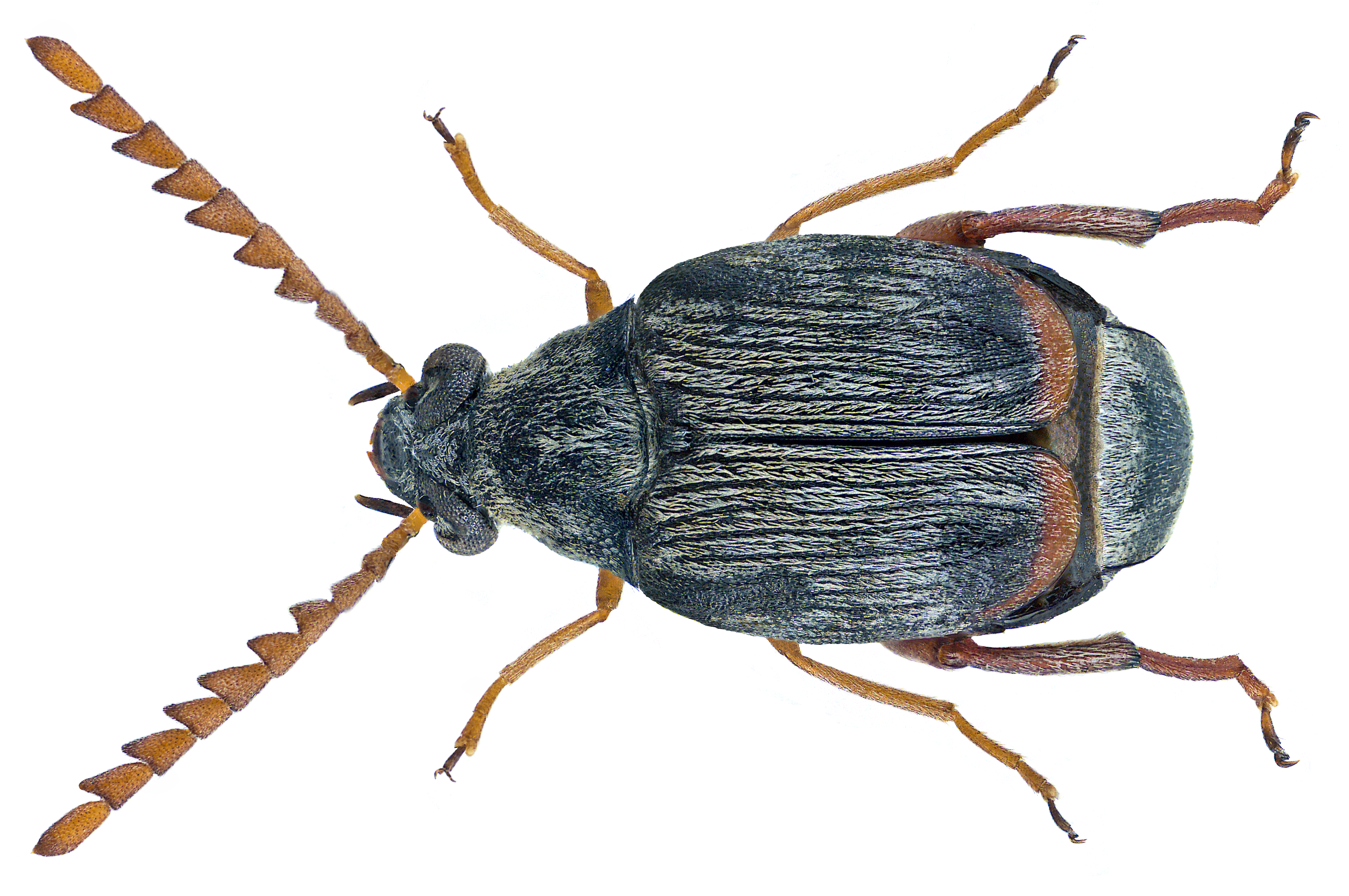
Bruchidius nalandus

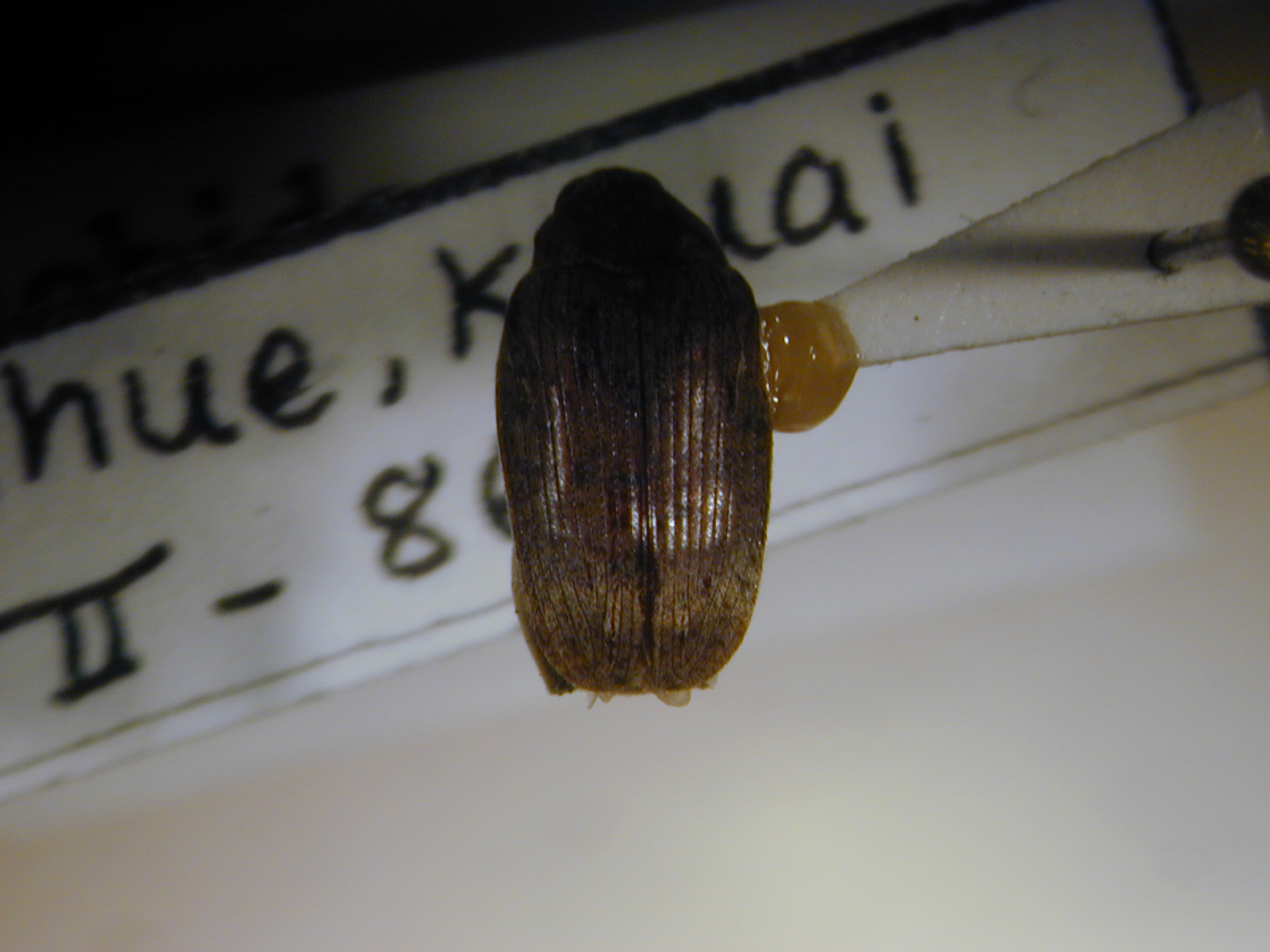
Caryedon serratus

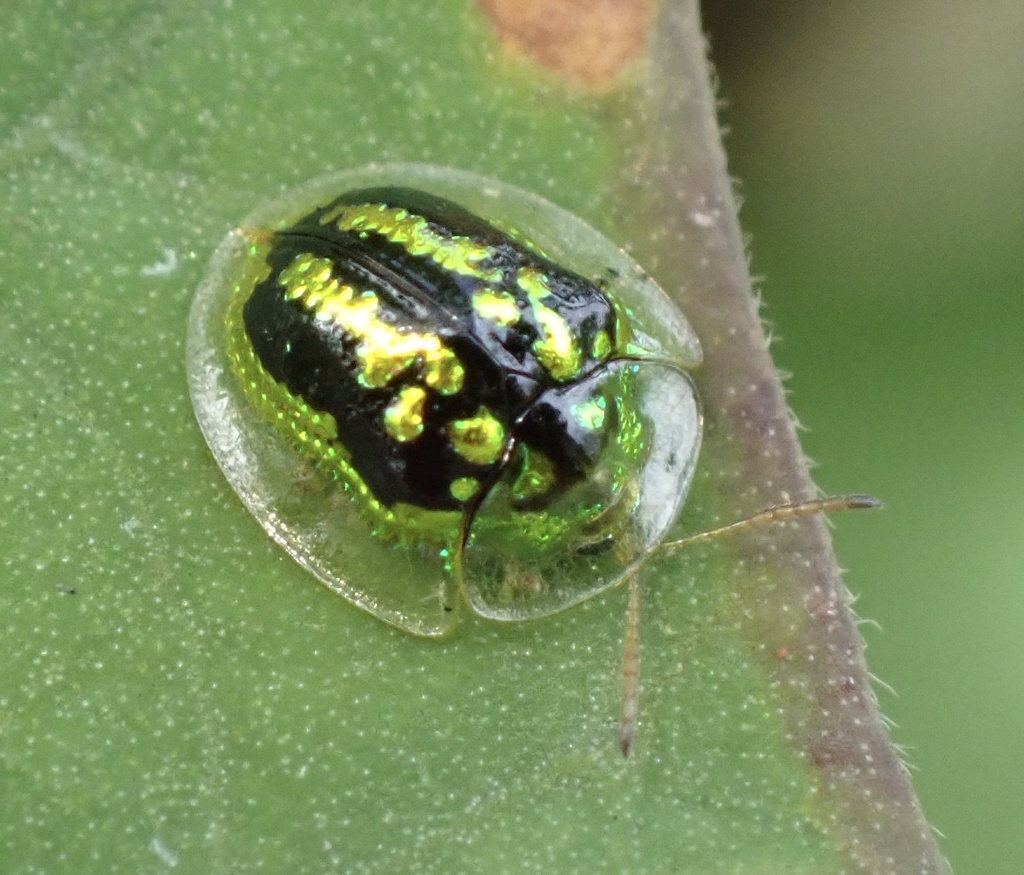
Cassida circumdata

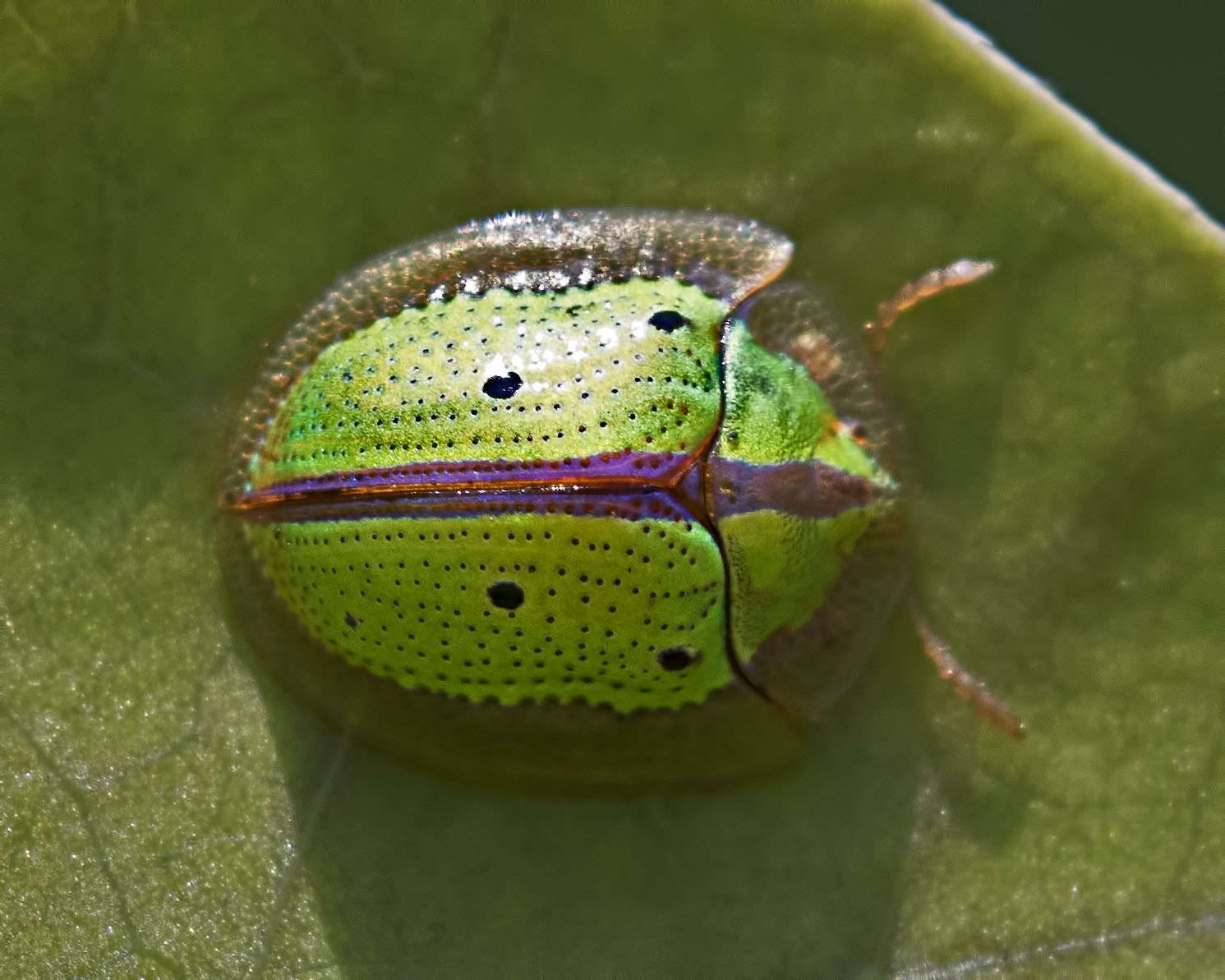
Chiridopsis bipunctata

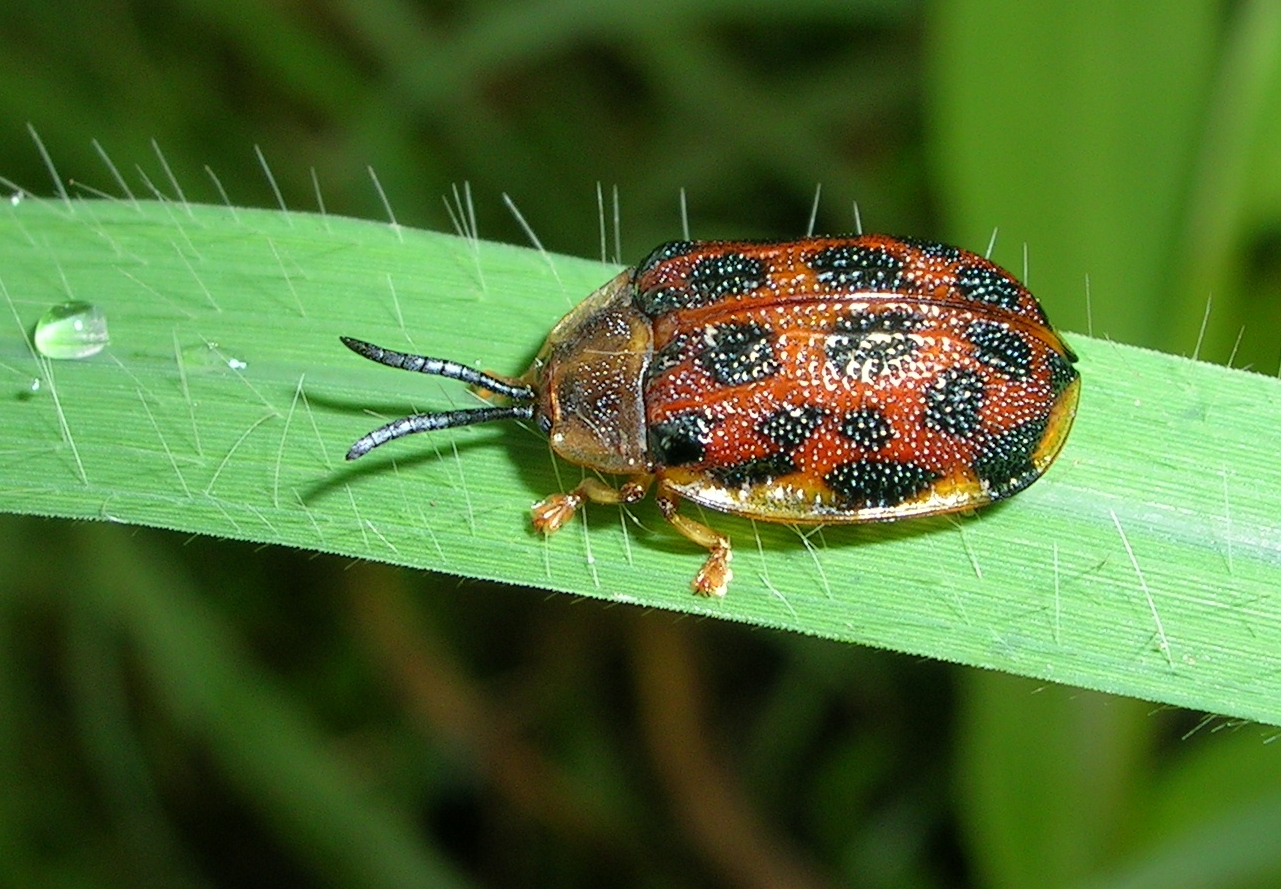
Epistictina reicheana

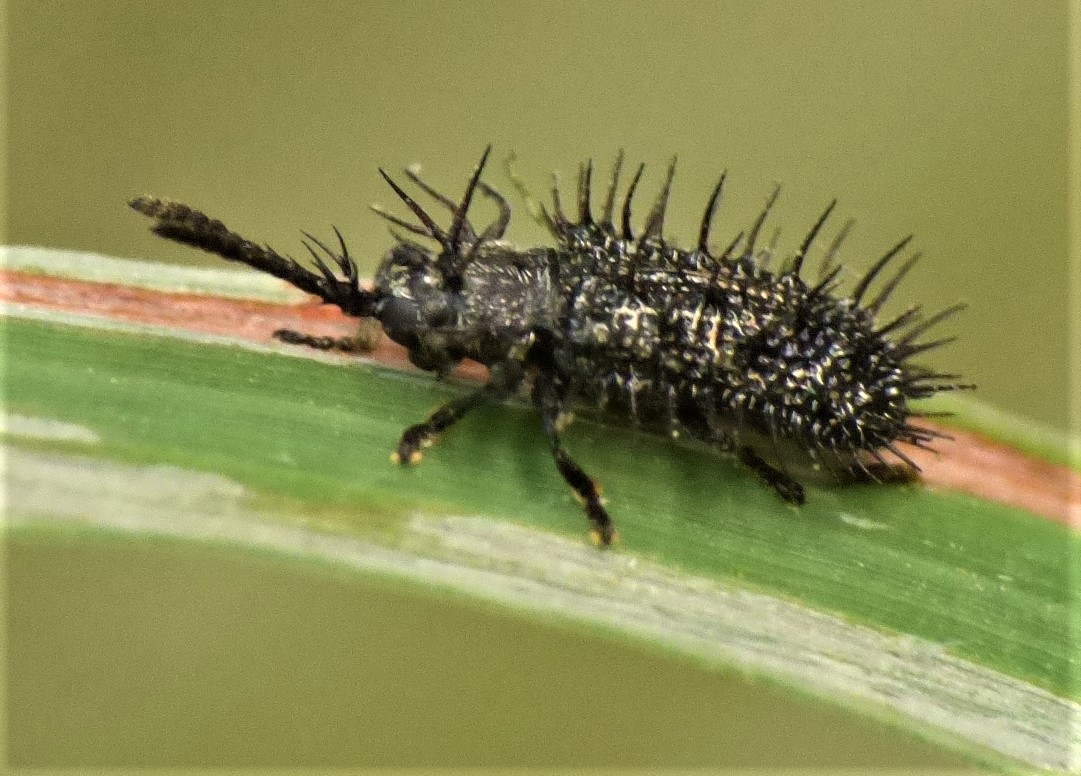
Hispa ramosa

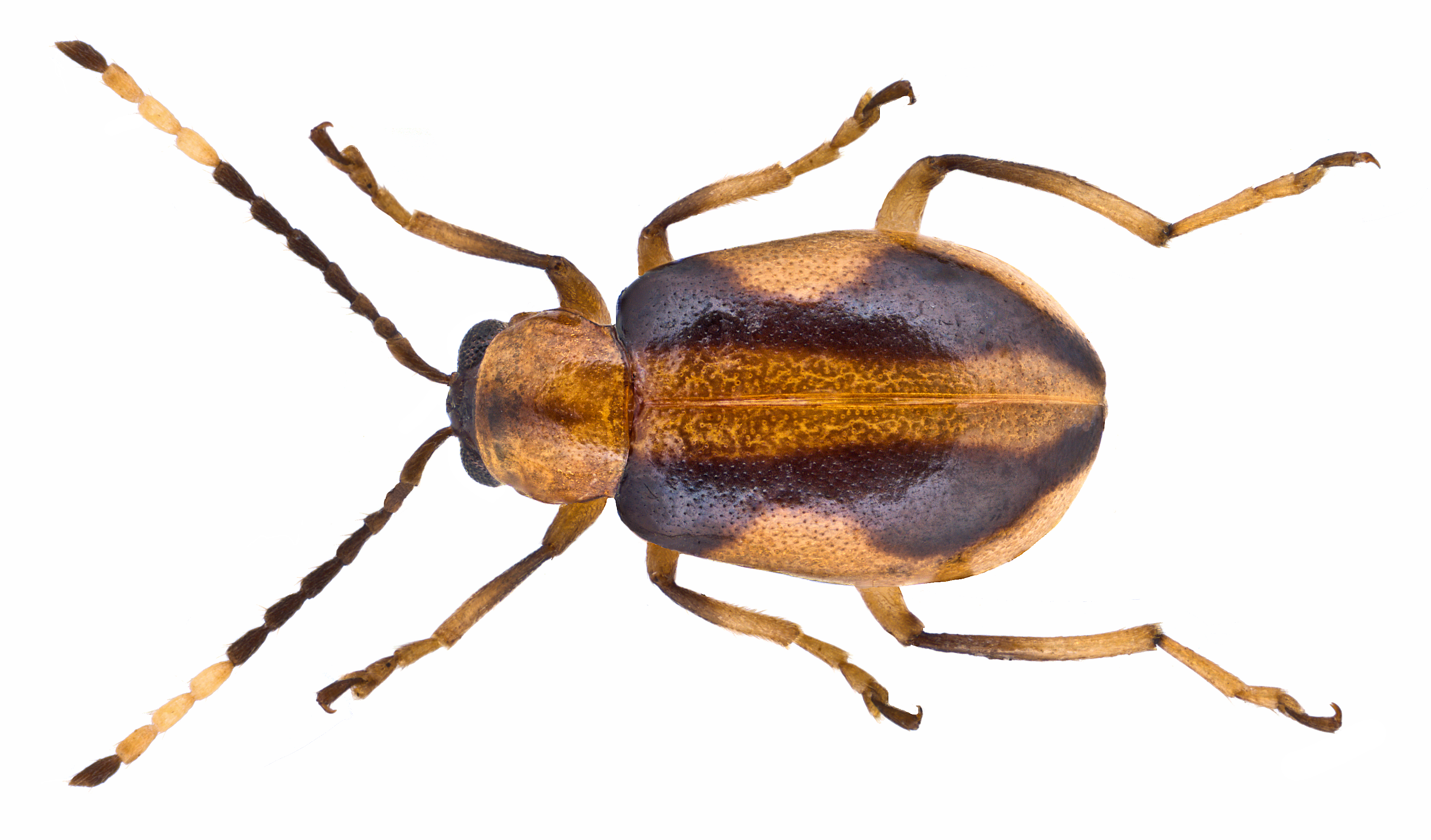
Medythia suturalis

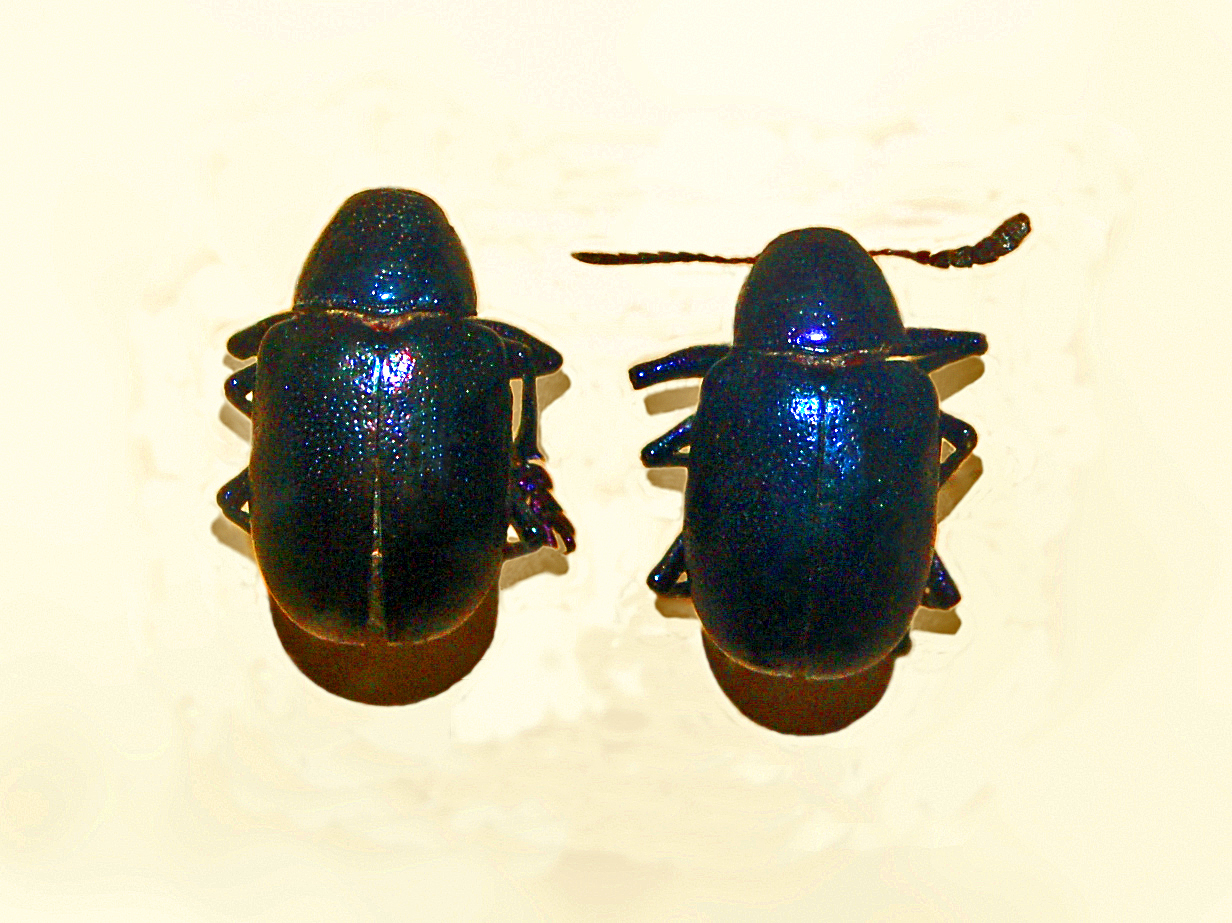
Platycorynus peregrinus

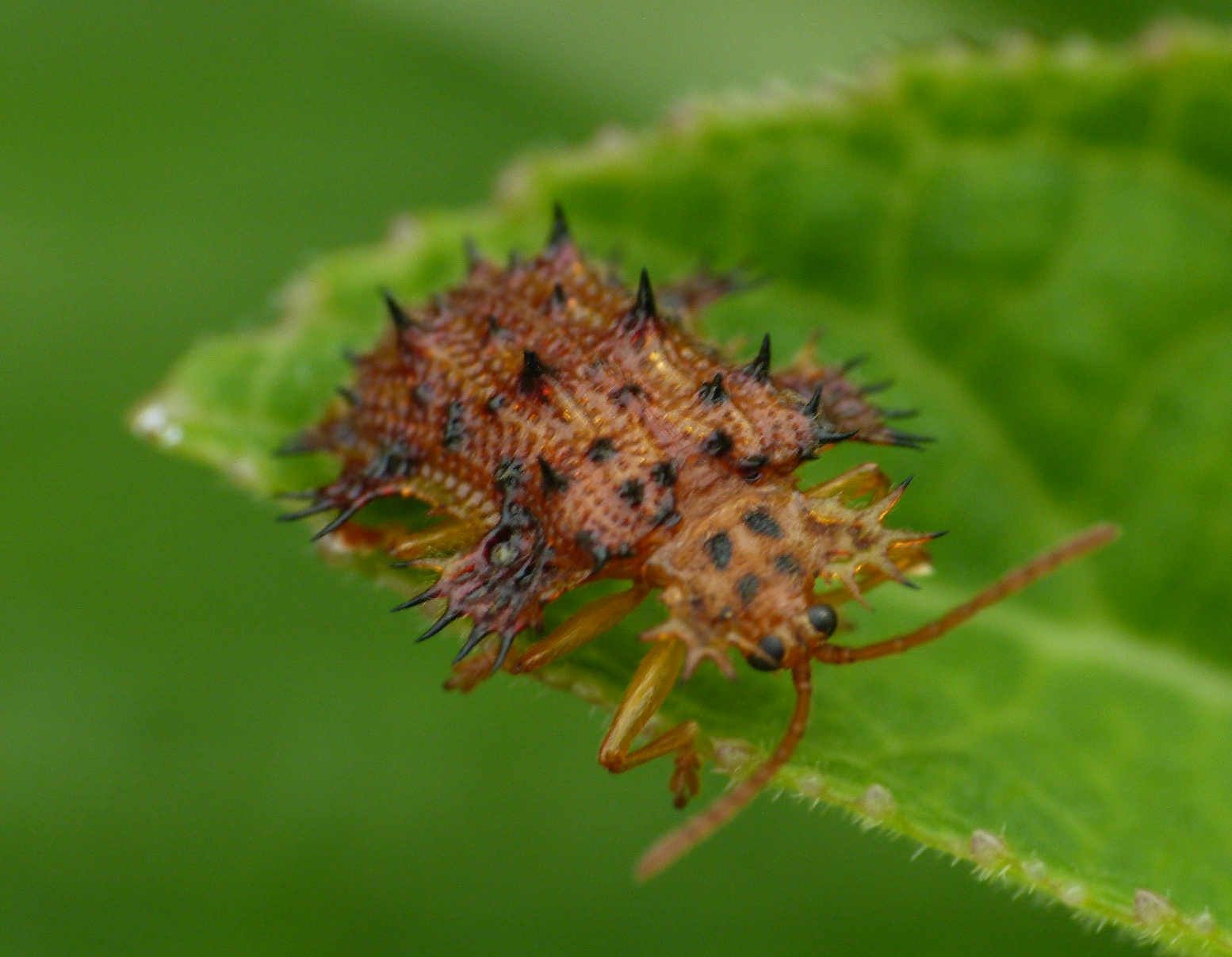
Platypria echidna

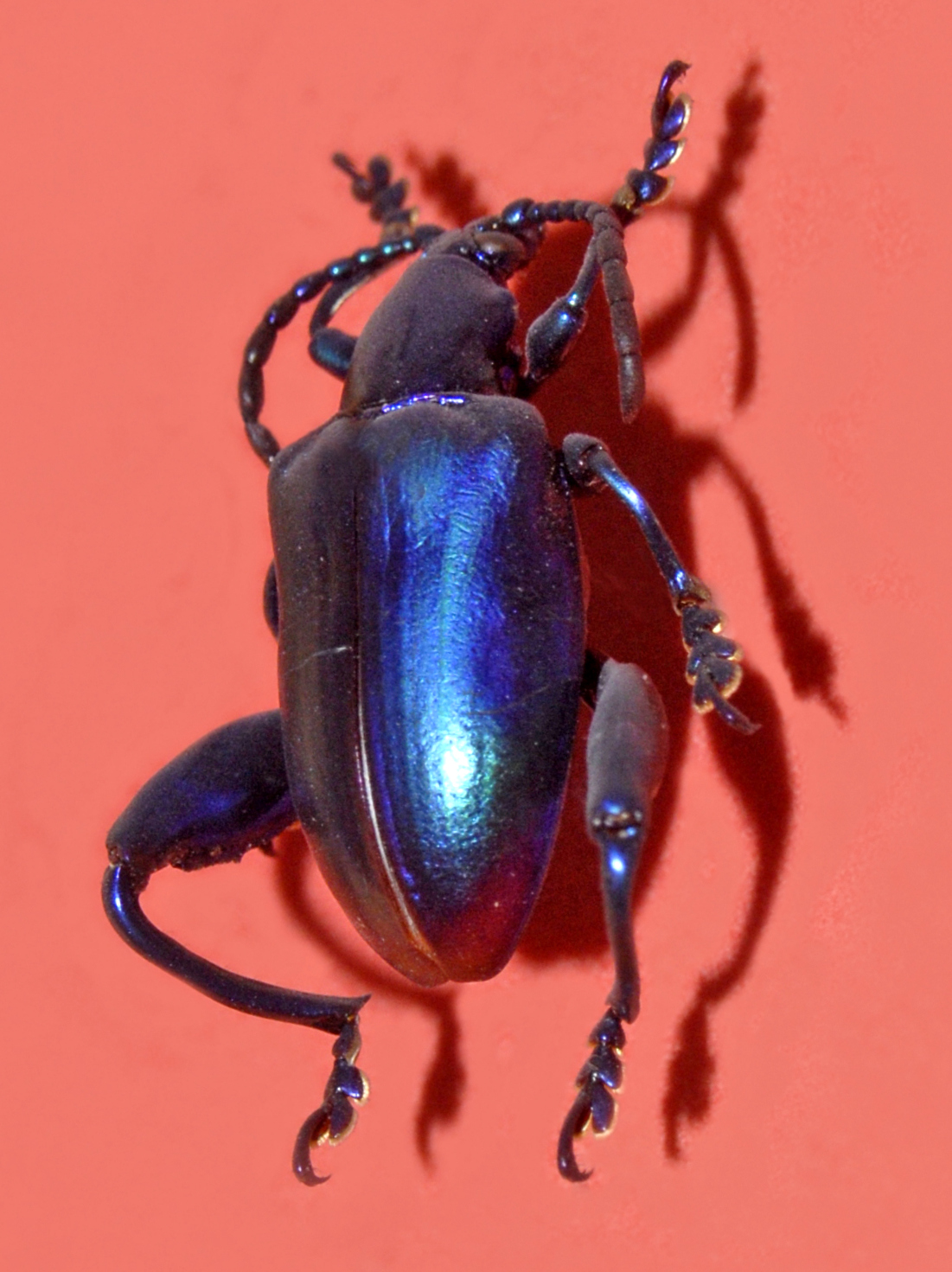
Sagra femorata

=== Family: Ciidae - Minute tree-fungus beetles ===
- Cis contendens
- Cis coriarius
- Xylographus ceylonicus
- Xylographus ritsemai

=== Family: Clambidae - Fringe-winged beetles ===
- Acalyptomerus asiaticus
- Clambus ceylonicus
- Clambus pumilus
- Clambus villosus

=== Family: Cleridae - Checkered beetles ===
- Stigmatium ceramboides
- Stigmatium gemmatus
- Tilloidea notata

=== Family: Coccinellidae - Lady beetles ===
- Afidenta misera
- Afidentula bisquadripunctata
- Anegleis cardoni
- Aspidimerus nigrovittatus
- Axinoscymnus puttarudriahi
- Brumoides lineatus
- Brumoides suturalis
- Brumus ceylonicus
- Cheilomenes sexmaculata
- Cheilomenes transversalis
- Chilocorus circumdatus
- Chilocorus nigritus
- Chilocorus subindicus
- Clitostethus fumatus
- Coccinella septempunctata
- Coelophora inaequalis
- Coelophora minki
- Cryptogonus bryanti
- Cryptogonus orbiculus
- Empia vittata
- Epilachna decemmaculata
- Epilachna delessertii
- Epilachna dumerili
- Epilachna flavicollis
- Epilachna hendecaspilota
- Epilachna zeylanica
- Harmonia octomaculata
- Henosepilachna quinta
- Henosepilachna septima
- Henosepilachna vigintioctopunctata
- Horniolus dispar
- Illeis bistigmosa
- Jauravia albidula
- Jauravia kapuri
- Jauravia limbata
- Jauravia opaca
- Jauravia pallidula
- Jauravia pilosula
- Jauravia pubescens
- Jauravia simplex
- Jauravia soror
- Kiiro cincta
- Megalocaria dilatata
- Micraspis discolor
- Microserangium laterale
- Nephus patruus
- Novius amabilis
- Novius breviuscula
- Novius cardinalis
- Novius octoguttata
- Novius vestita
- Ortalia horni
- Ortalia kandyana
- Ortalia minuta
- Pharoscymnus suturalis
- Platynaspis flavoguttata
- Propylea dissecta
- Propylea luteopustulata
- Pseudaspidimerus flaviceps
- Pseudaspidimerus mauliki
- Pseudaspidimerus trinotatus
- Pseudaspidimerus uttami
- Scymnus albopilis
- Scymnus apiciflavus
- Scymnus ceylonicus
- Scymnus coccivora
- Scymnus fuscatus
- Scymnus gratiosus
- Scymnus hilaris
- Scymnus latemaculatus
- Scymnus lepidulus
- Scymnus musculus
- Scymnus nubilus
- Scymnus quadrillum
- Scymnus saciformis
- Scymnus victoris
- Sticholotis horni
- Sticholotis rufoplagiata
- Sticholotis sanguinolenta
- Synona obscura
- Synonycha grandis
- Telsimia ceylonica
- Telsimia rotundata
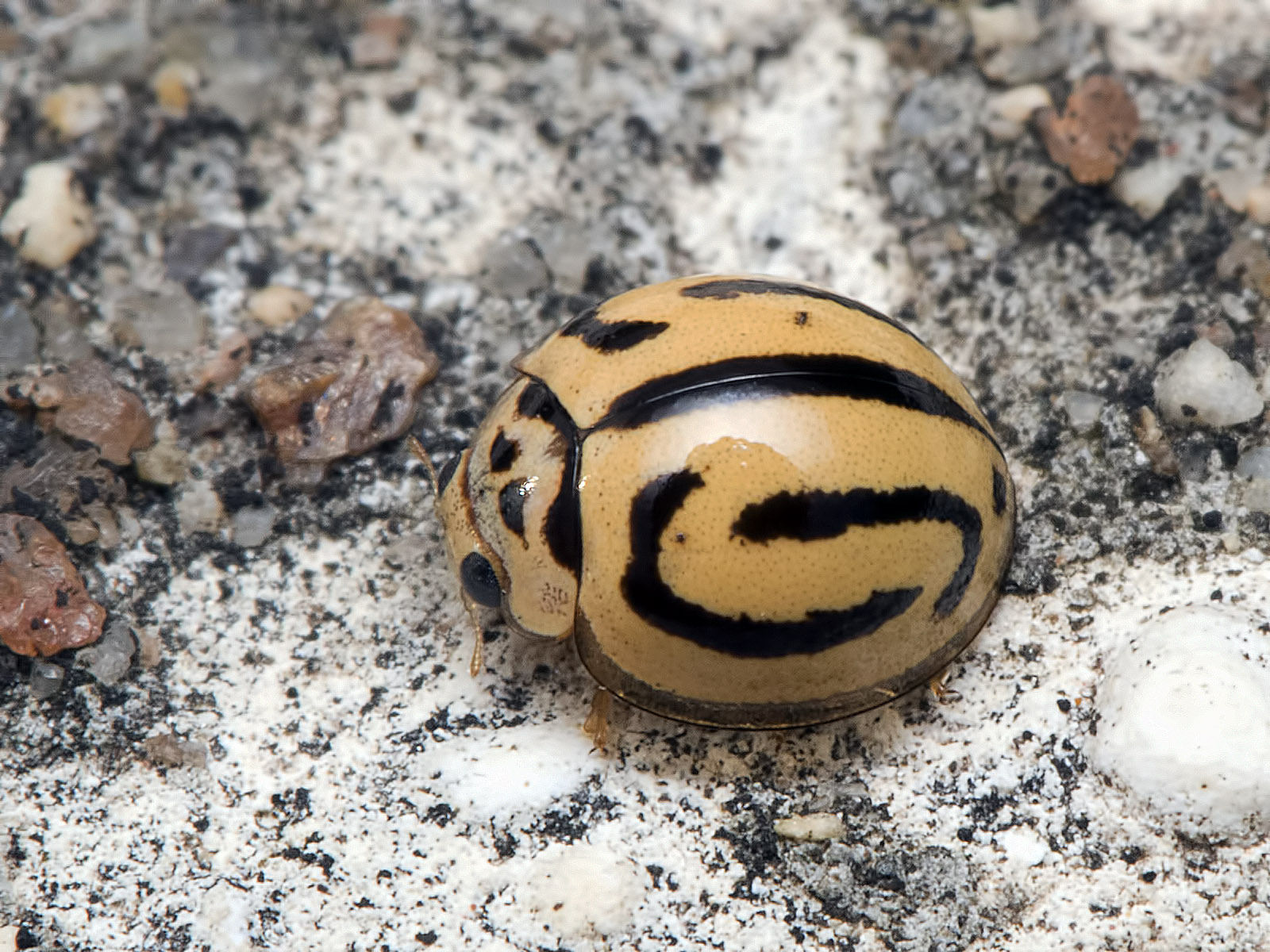
Anegleis cardoni

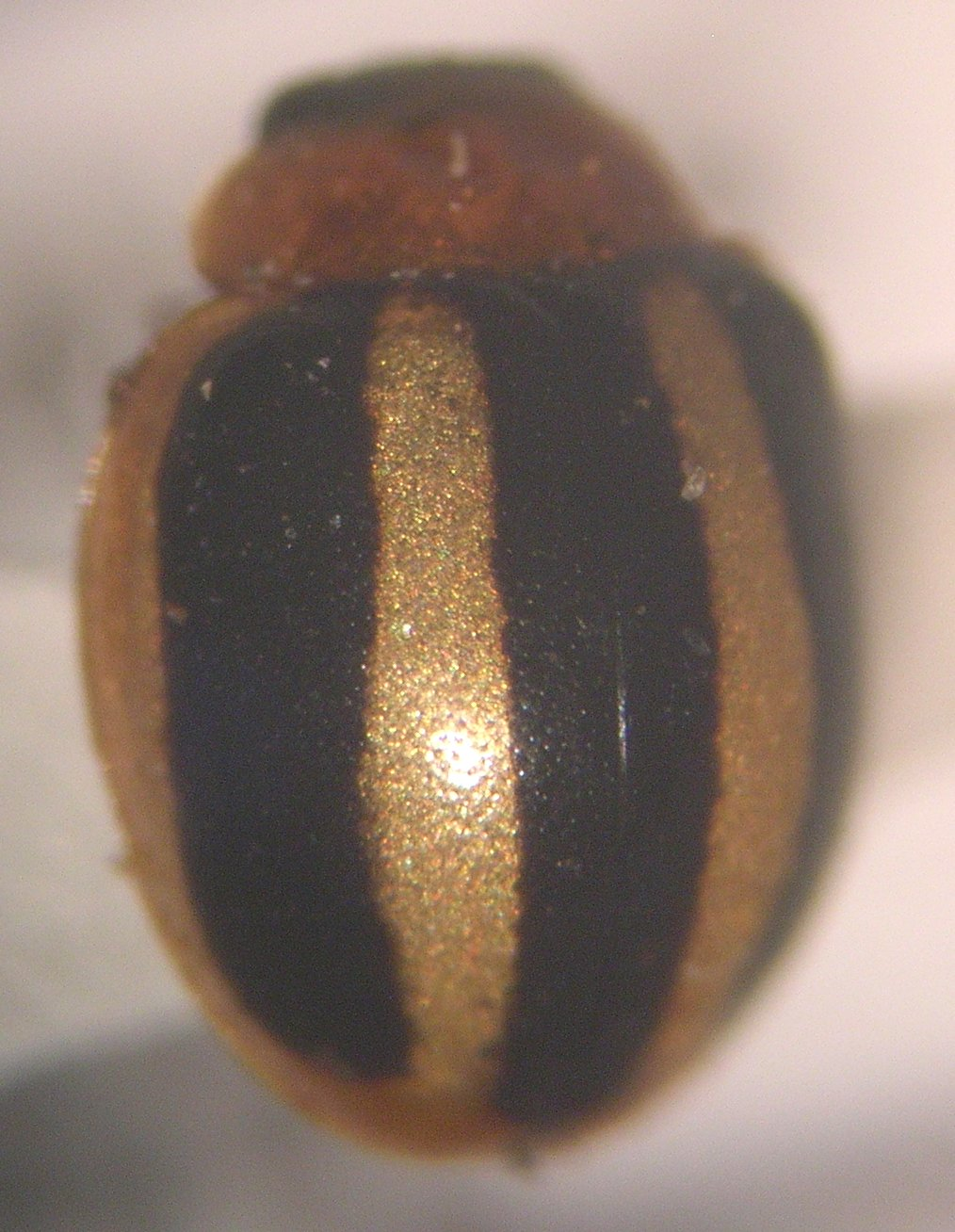
Brumoides suturalis

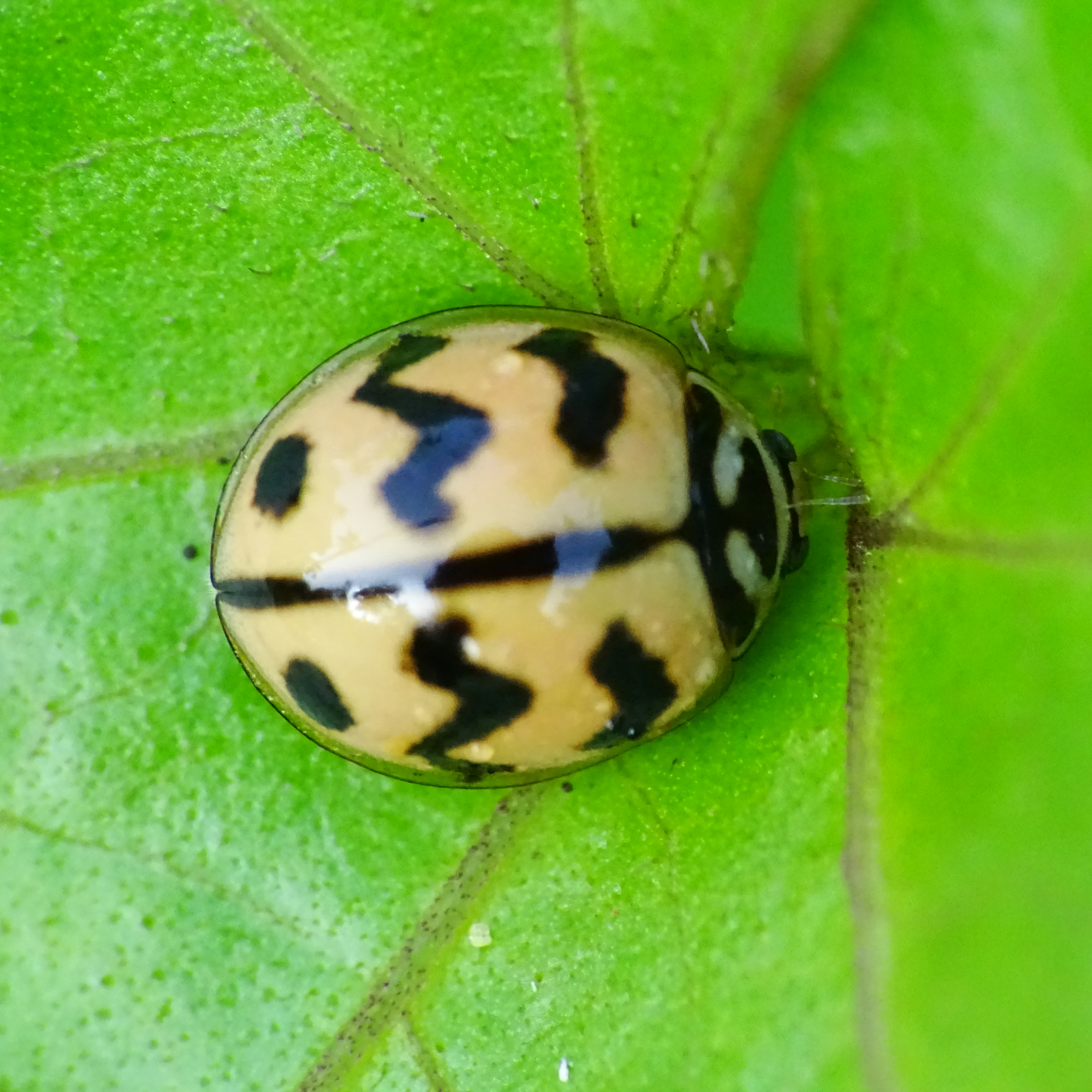
Cheilomenes sexmaculata

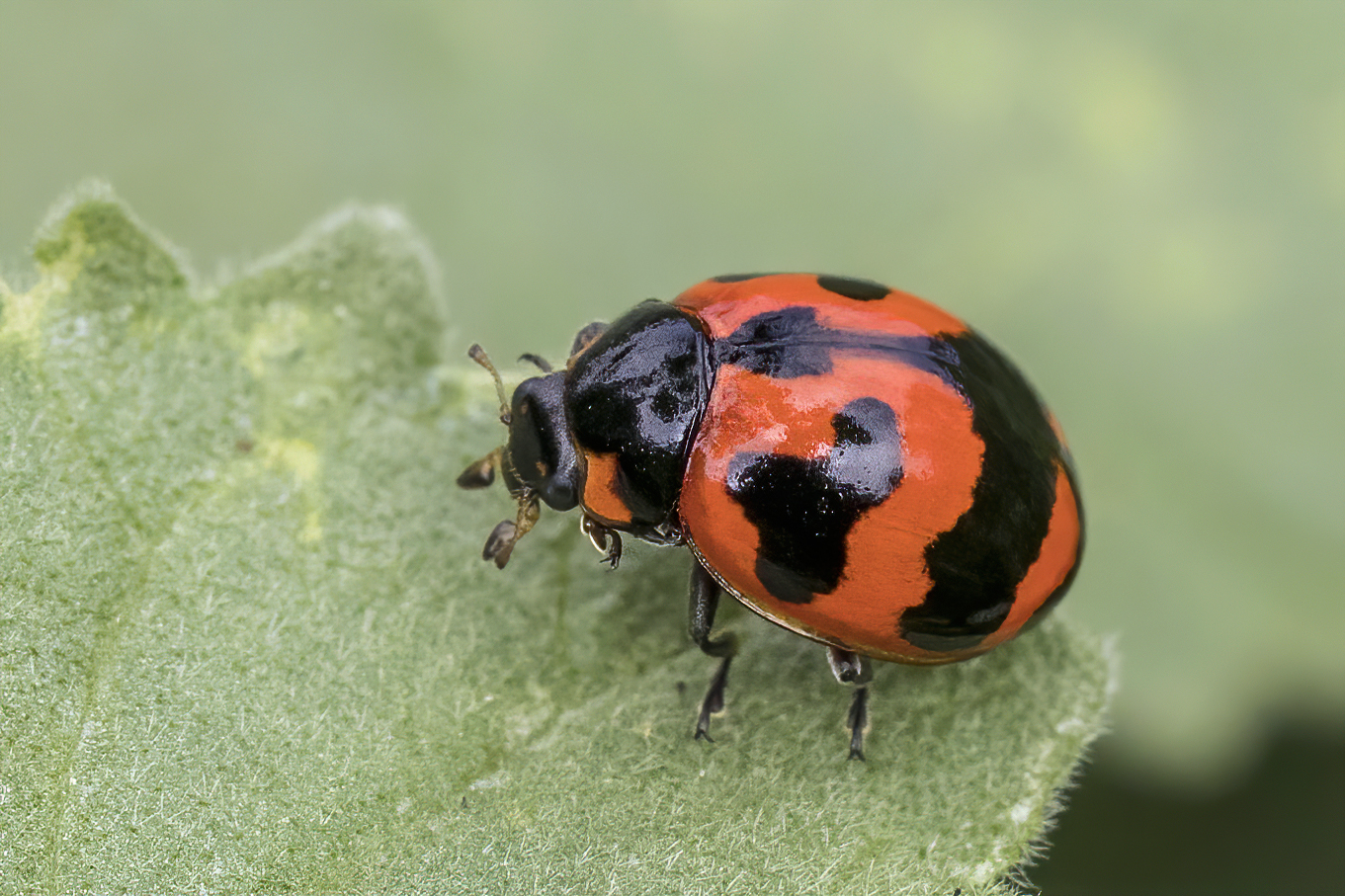
Coccinella transversalis

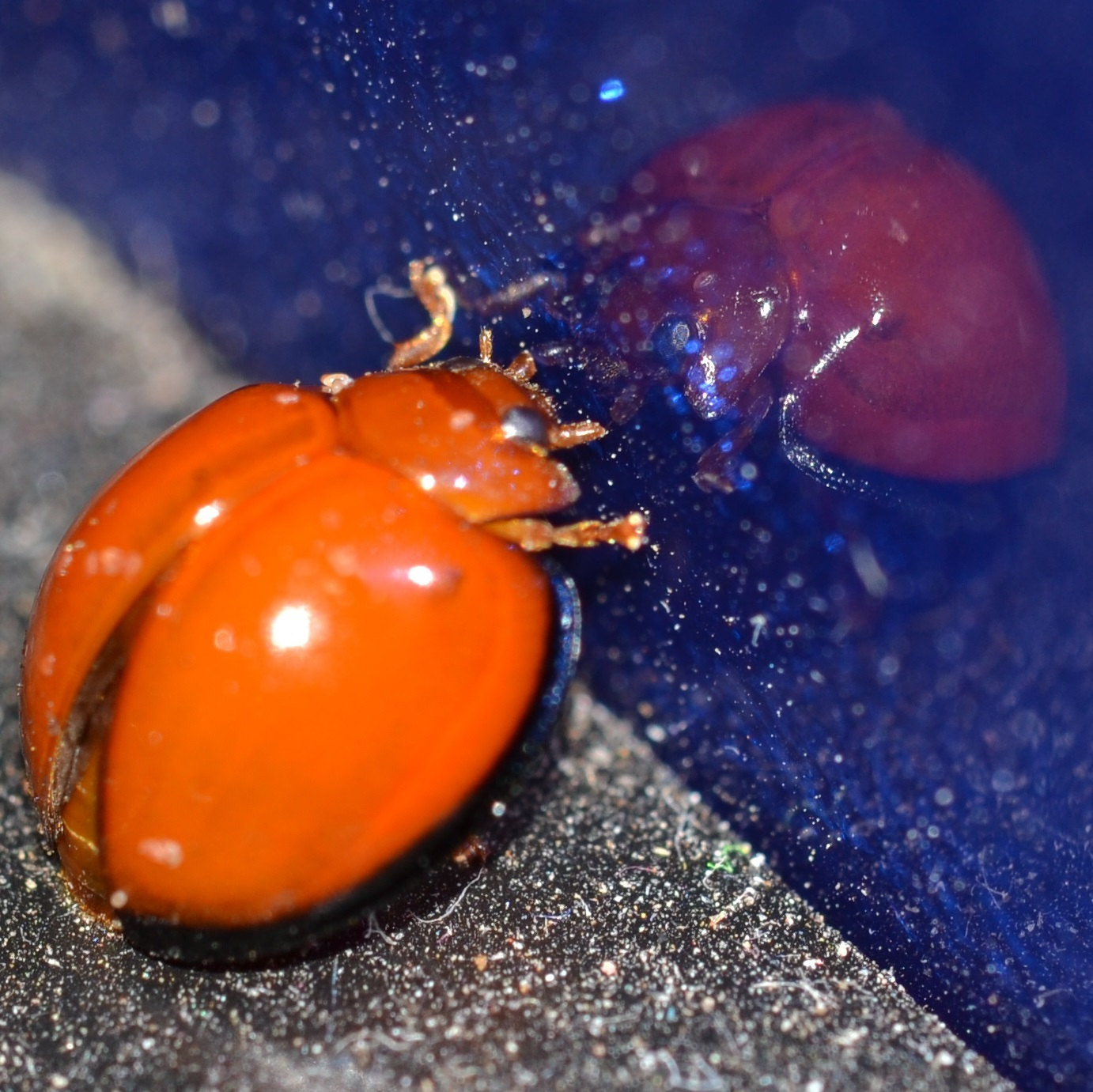
Chilocorus circumdatus

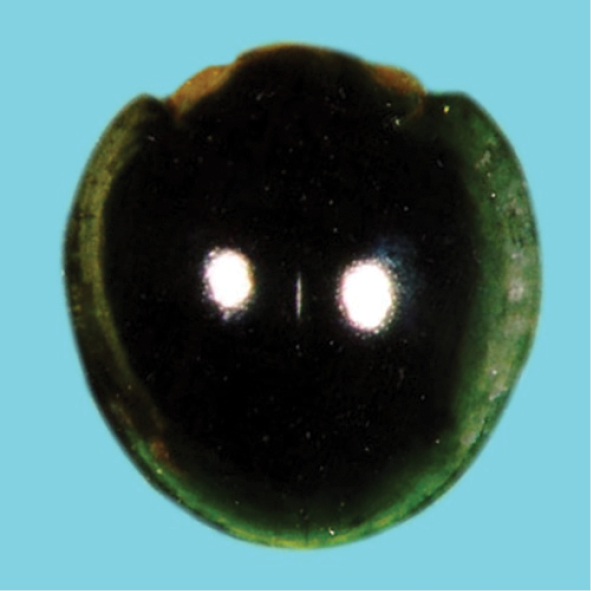
Chilocorus nigrita

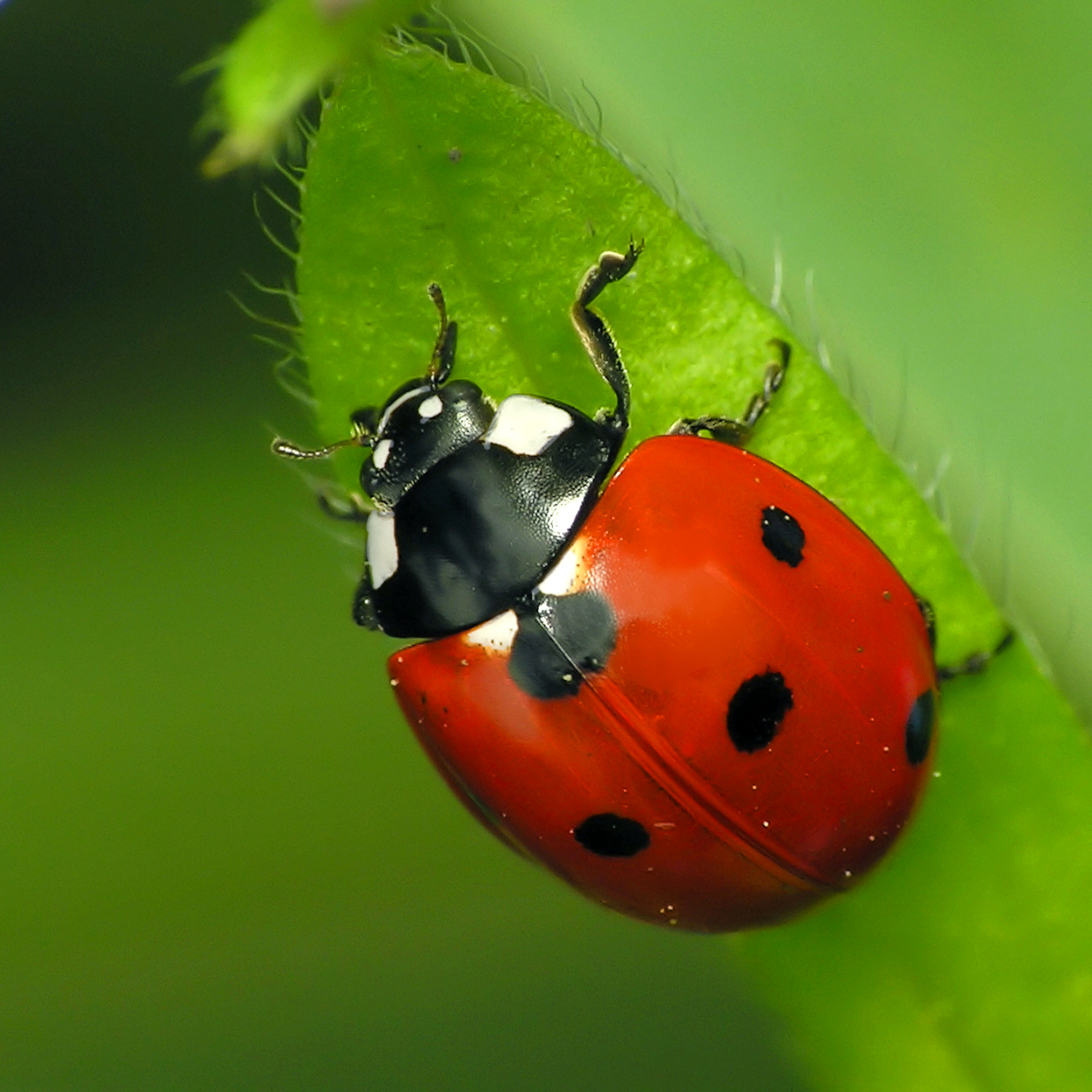
Coccinella septempunctata

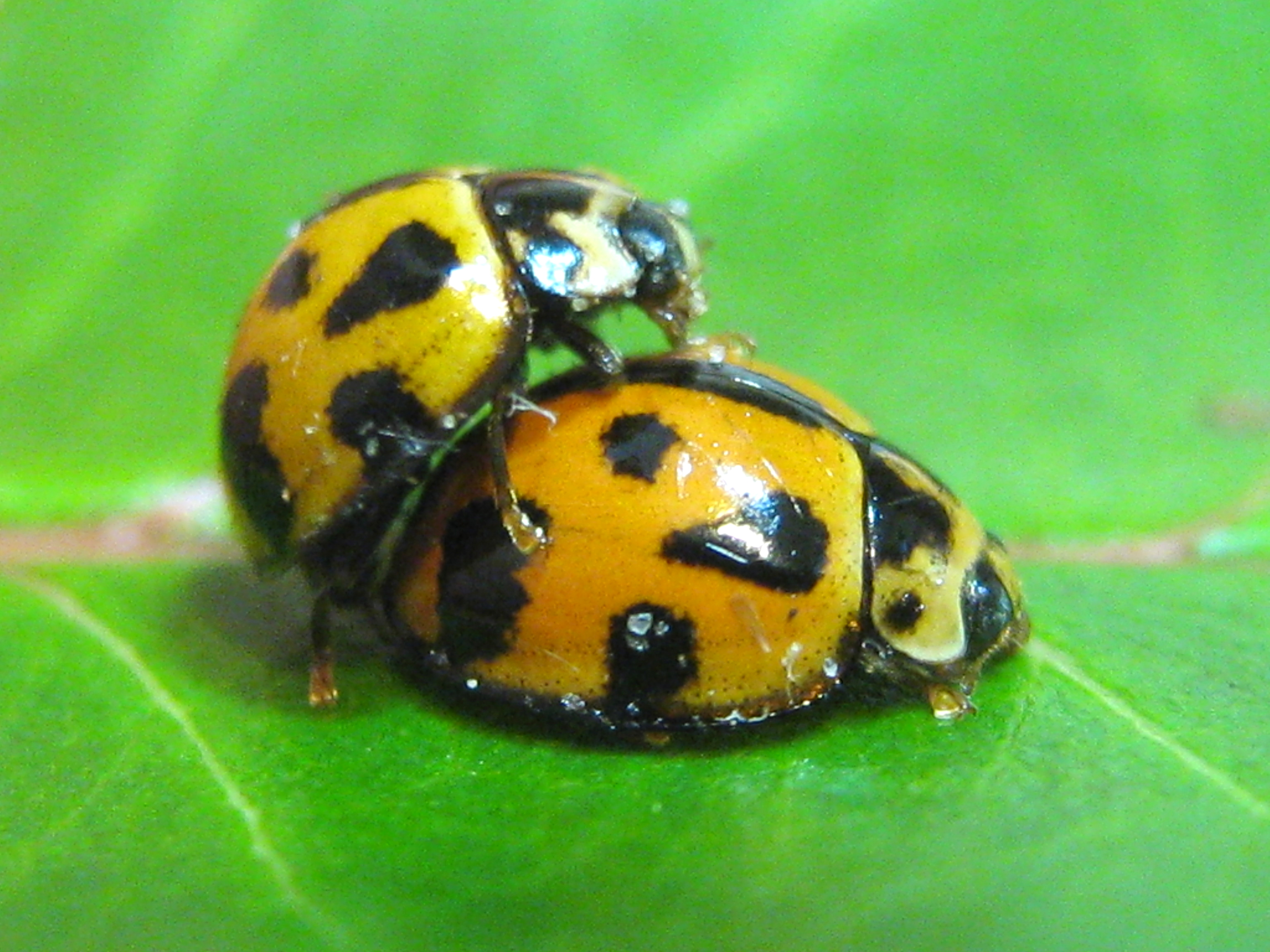
Coelophora inaequalis

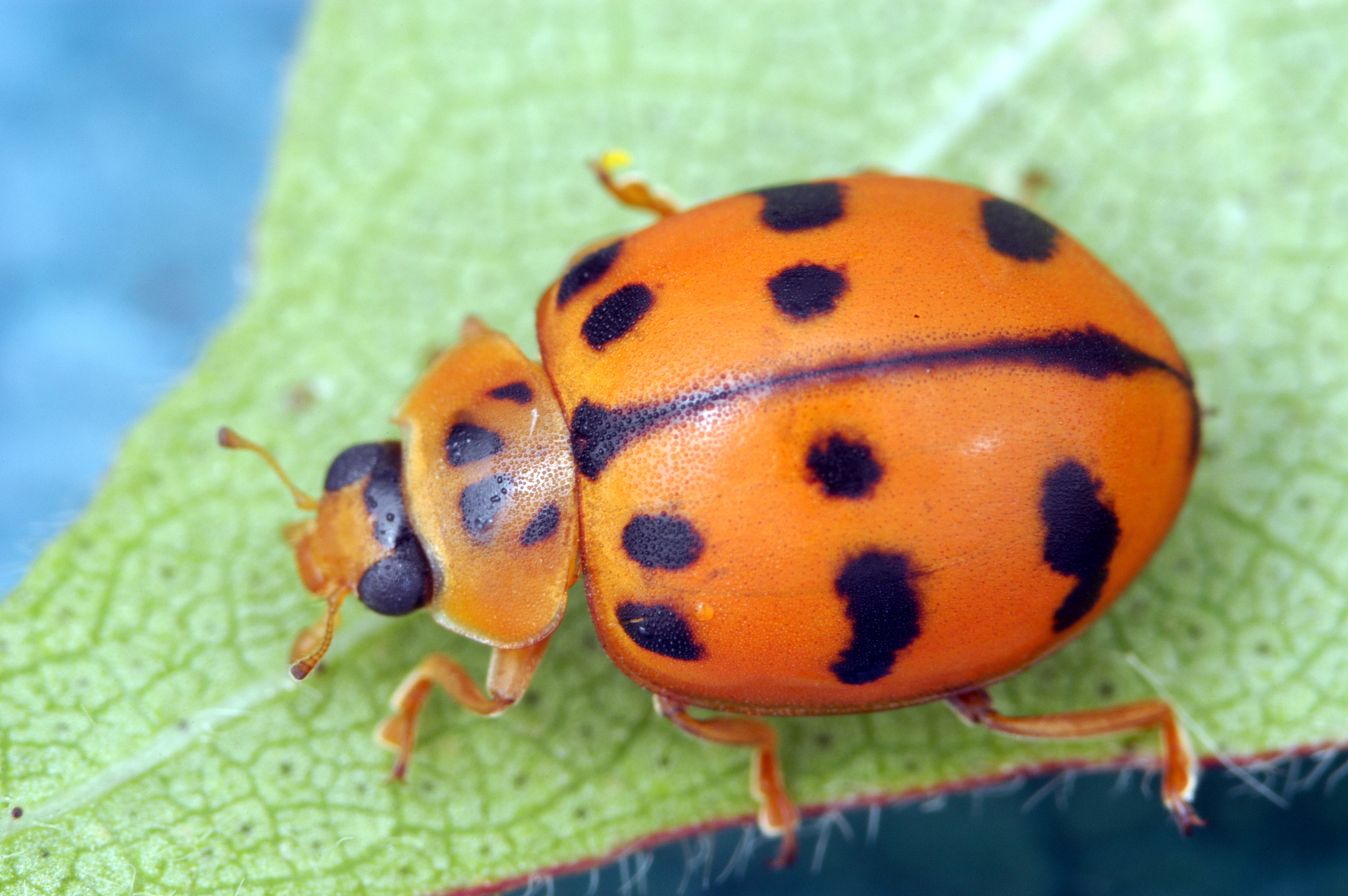
Harmonia octomaculata

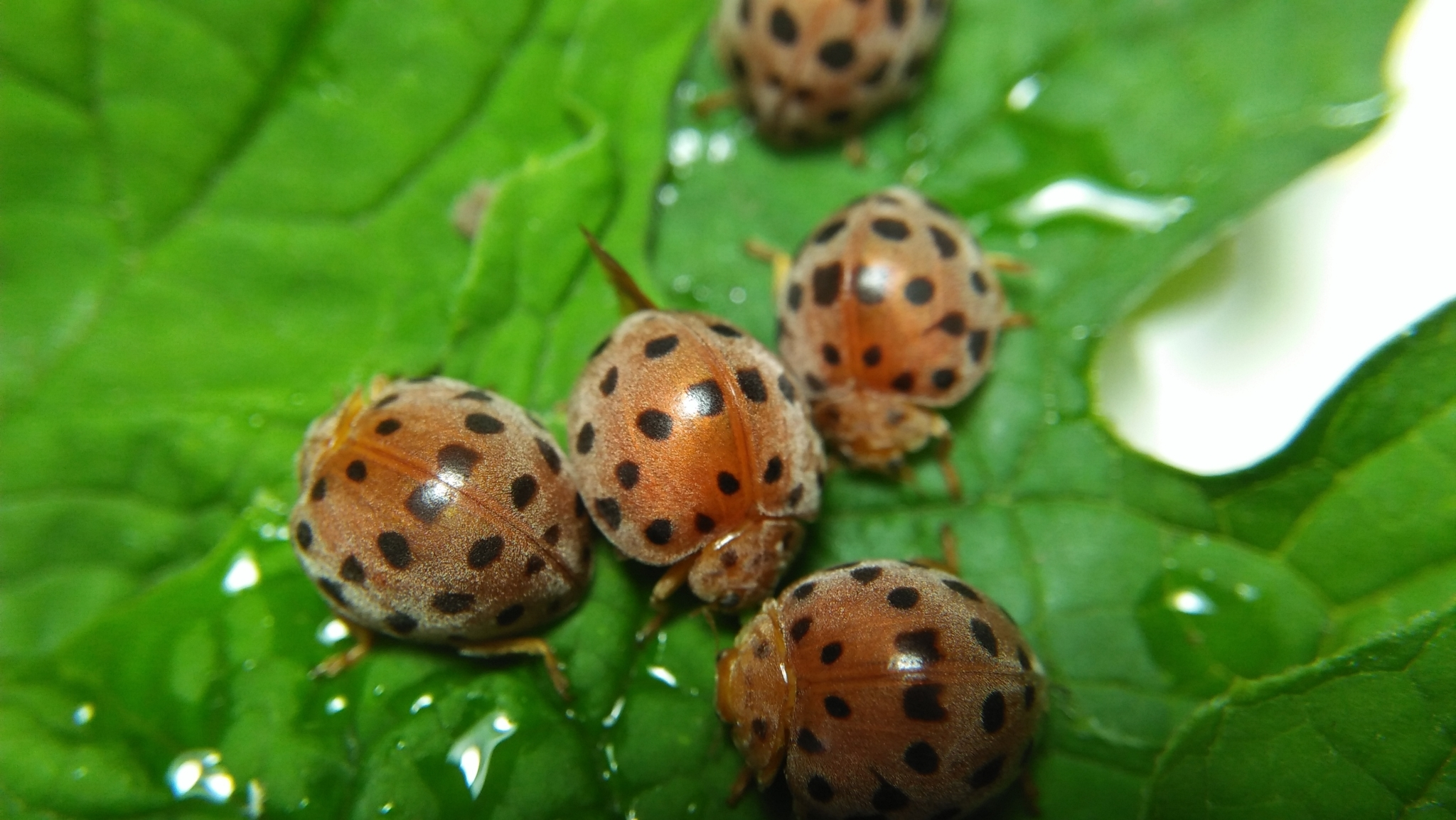
Henosepilachna septima

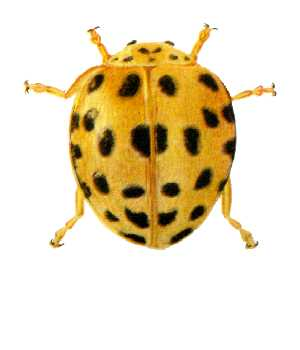
Henosepilachna vigintioctopunctata

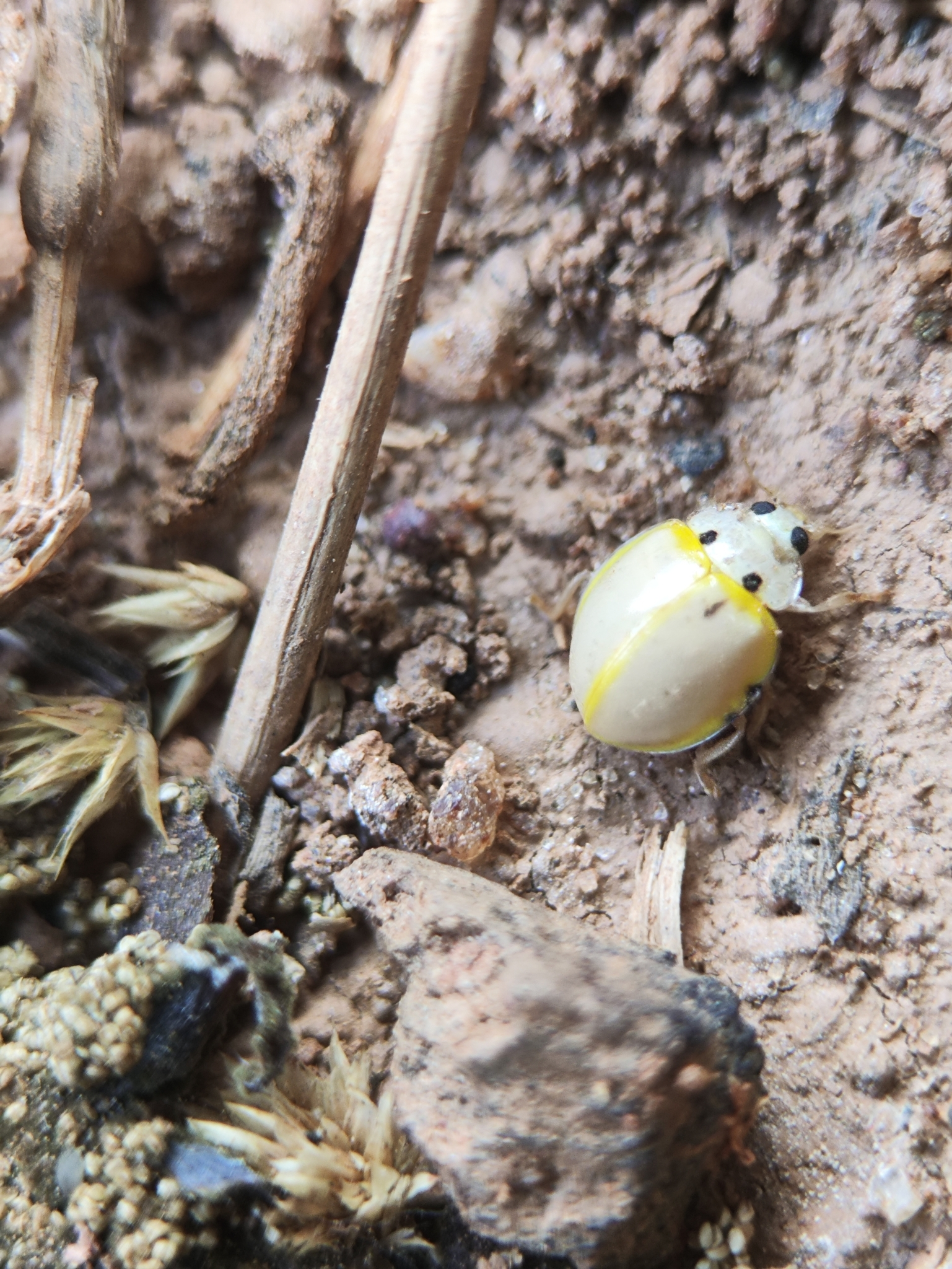
Illeis cincta

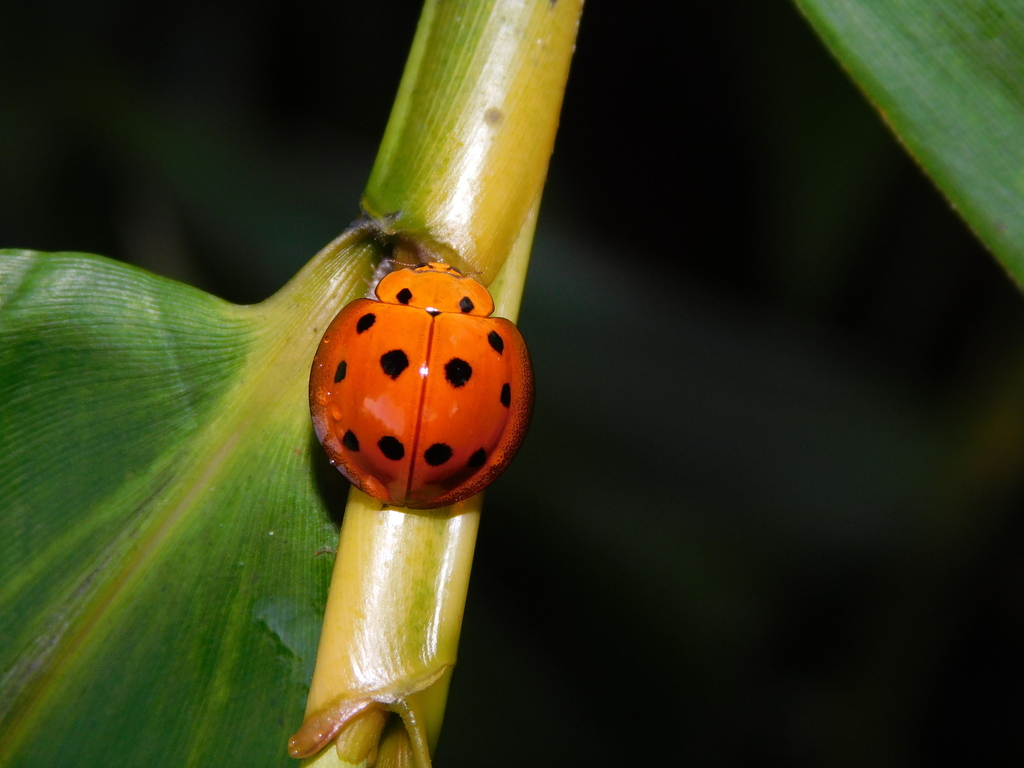
Megalocaria dilatata

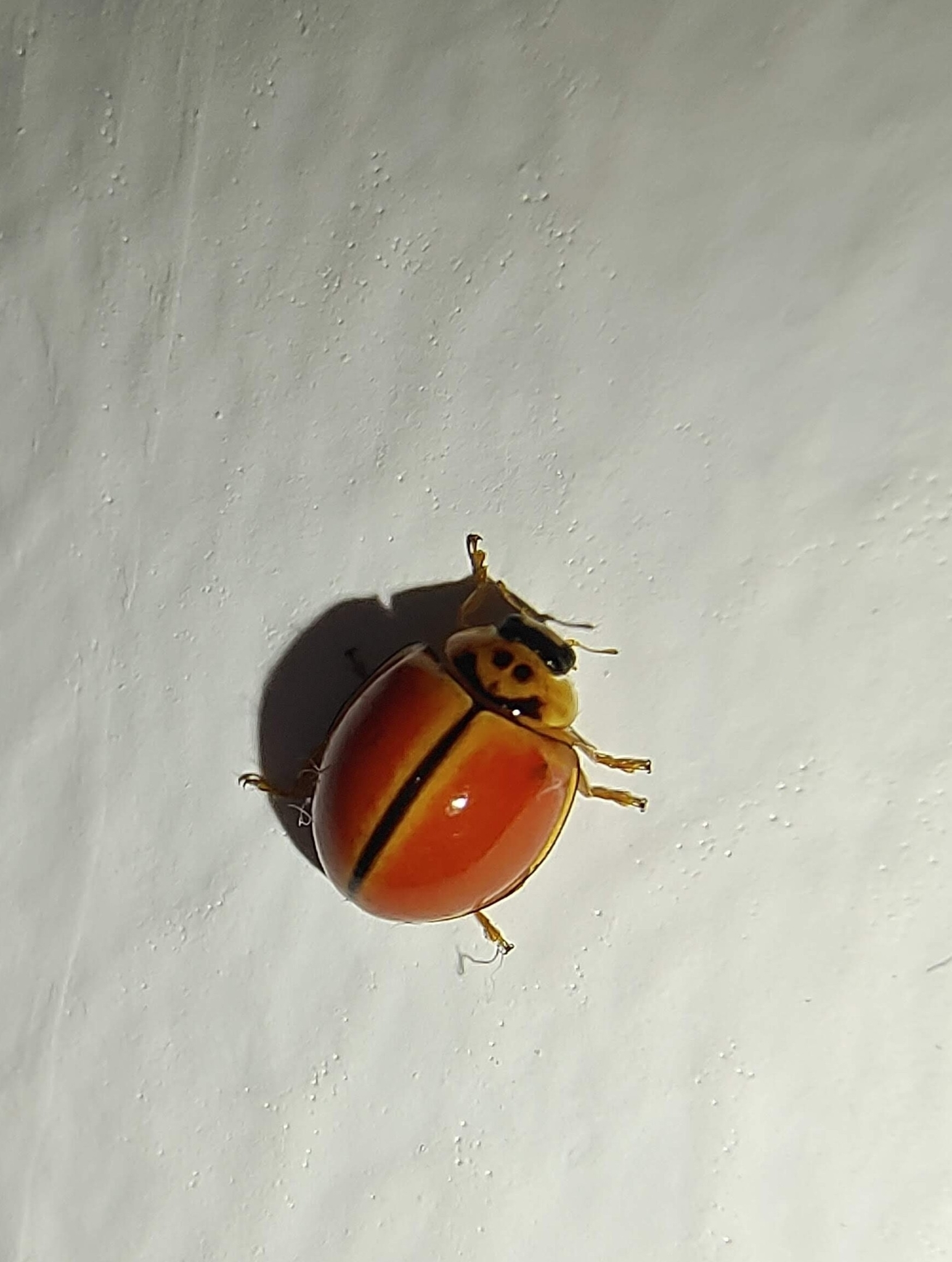
Micraspis discolor

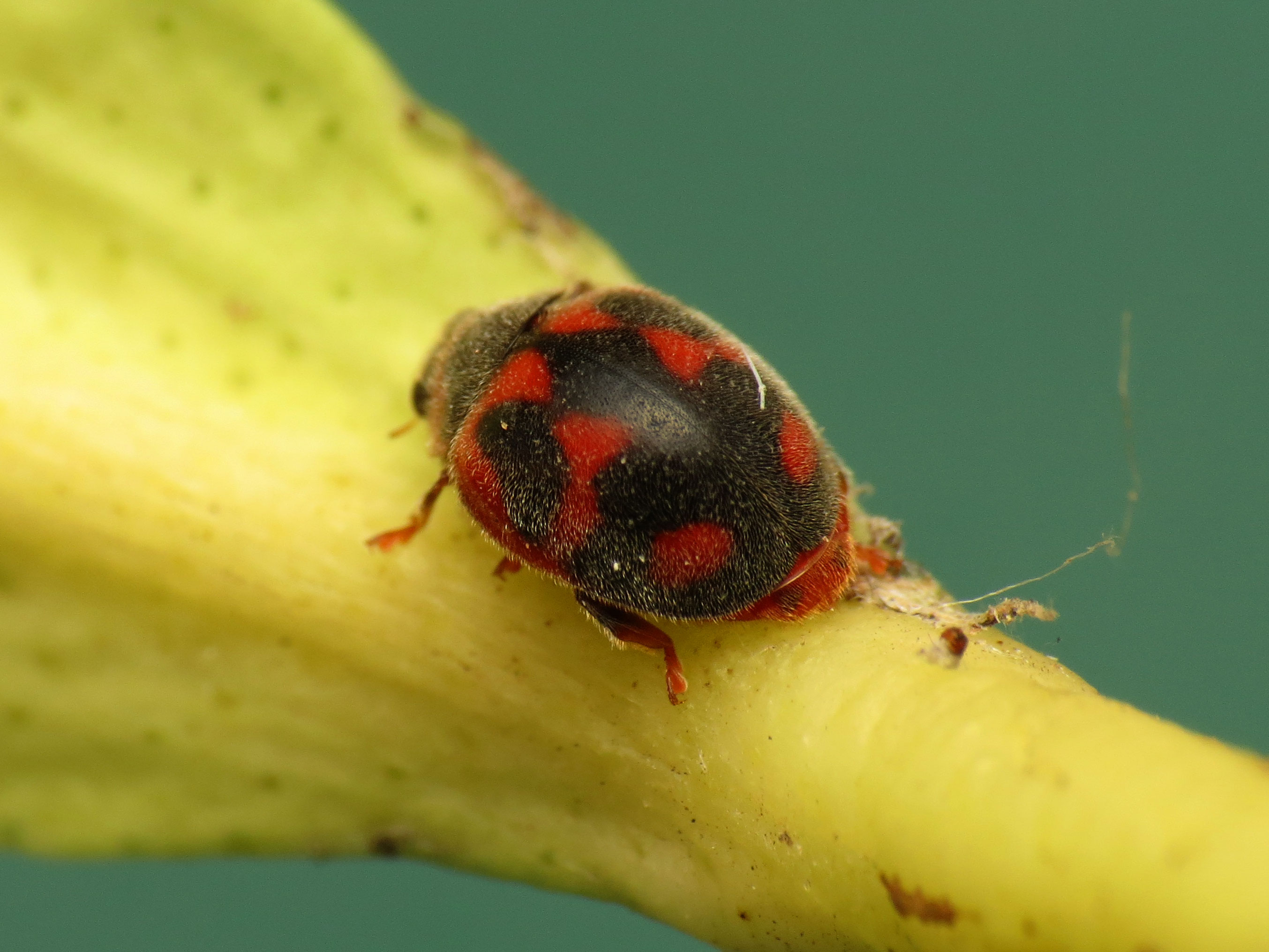
Novius cardinalis

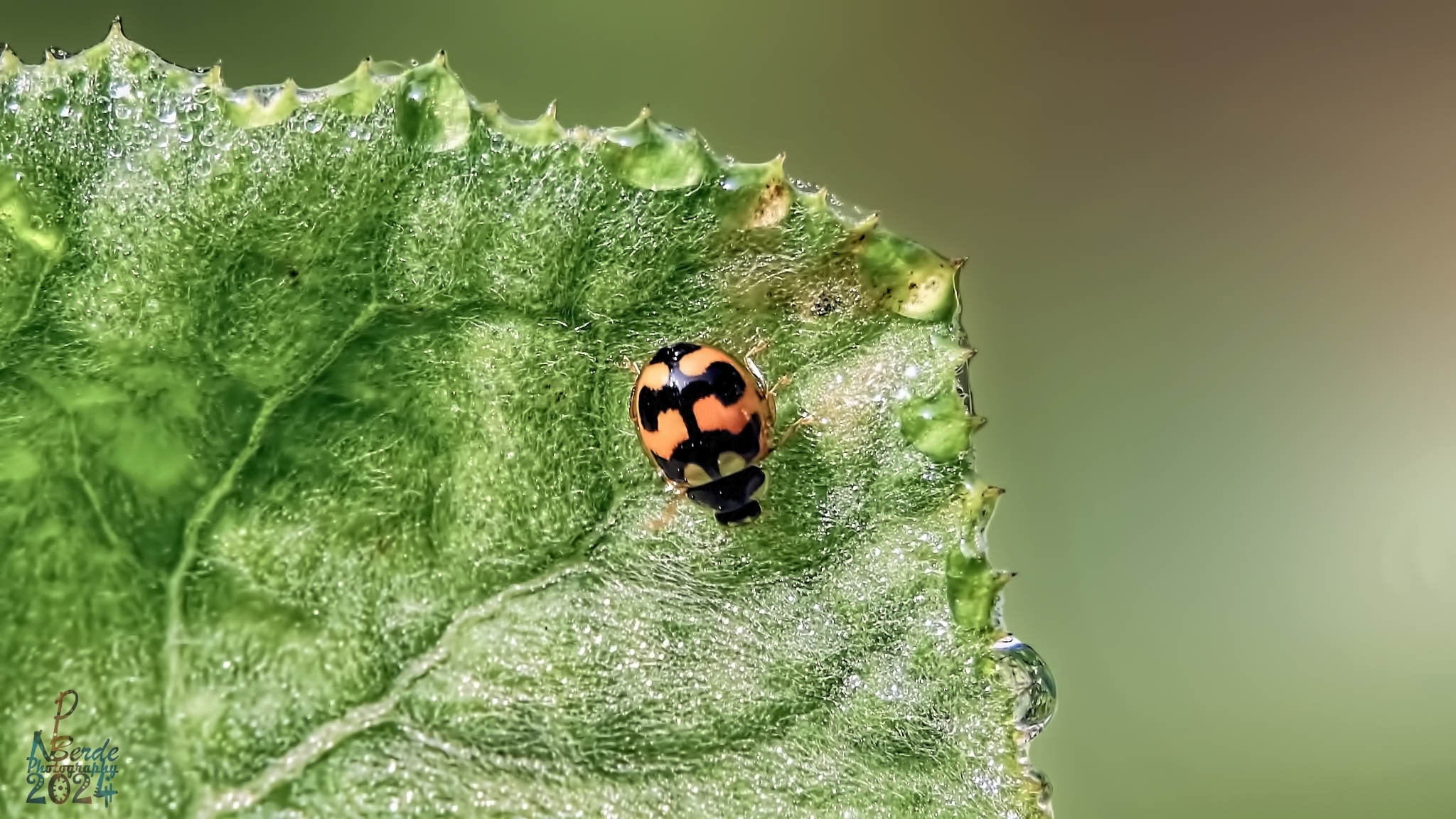
Propylea dissecta

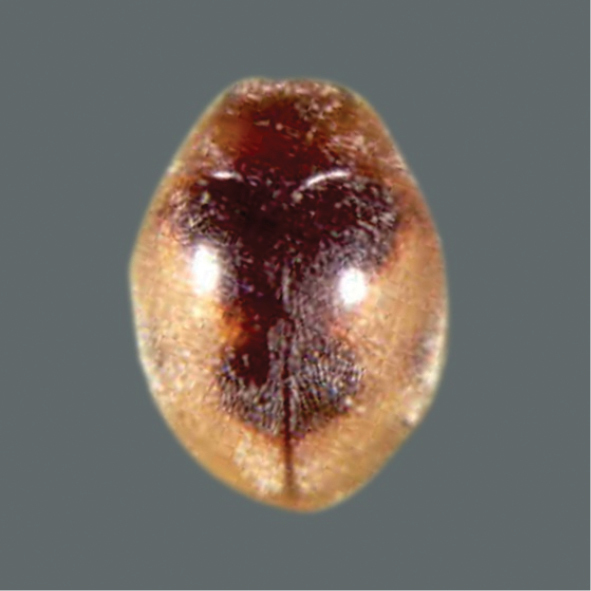
Scymnus coccivora

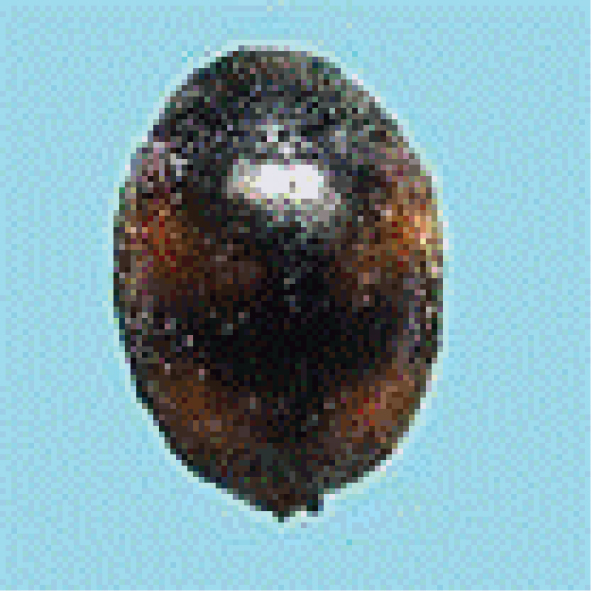
Scymnus latemaculatus

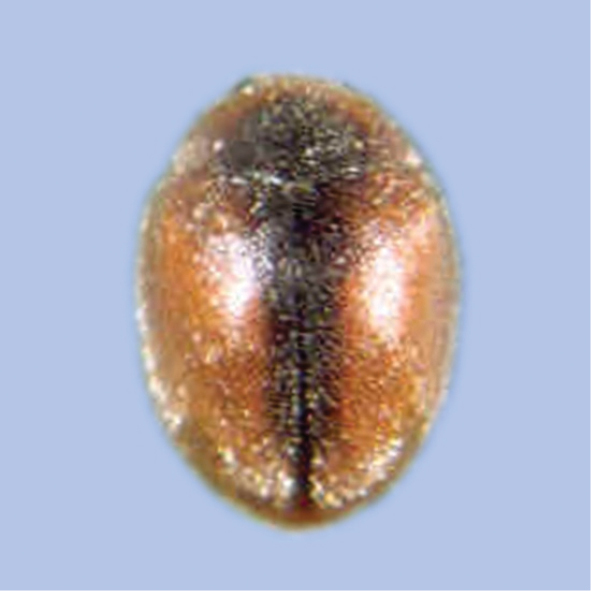
Scymnus nubilus

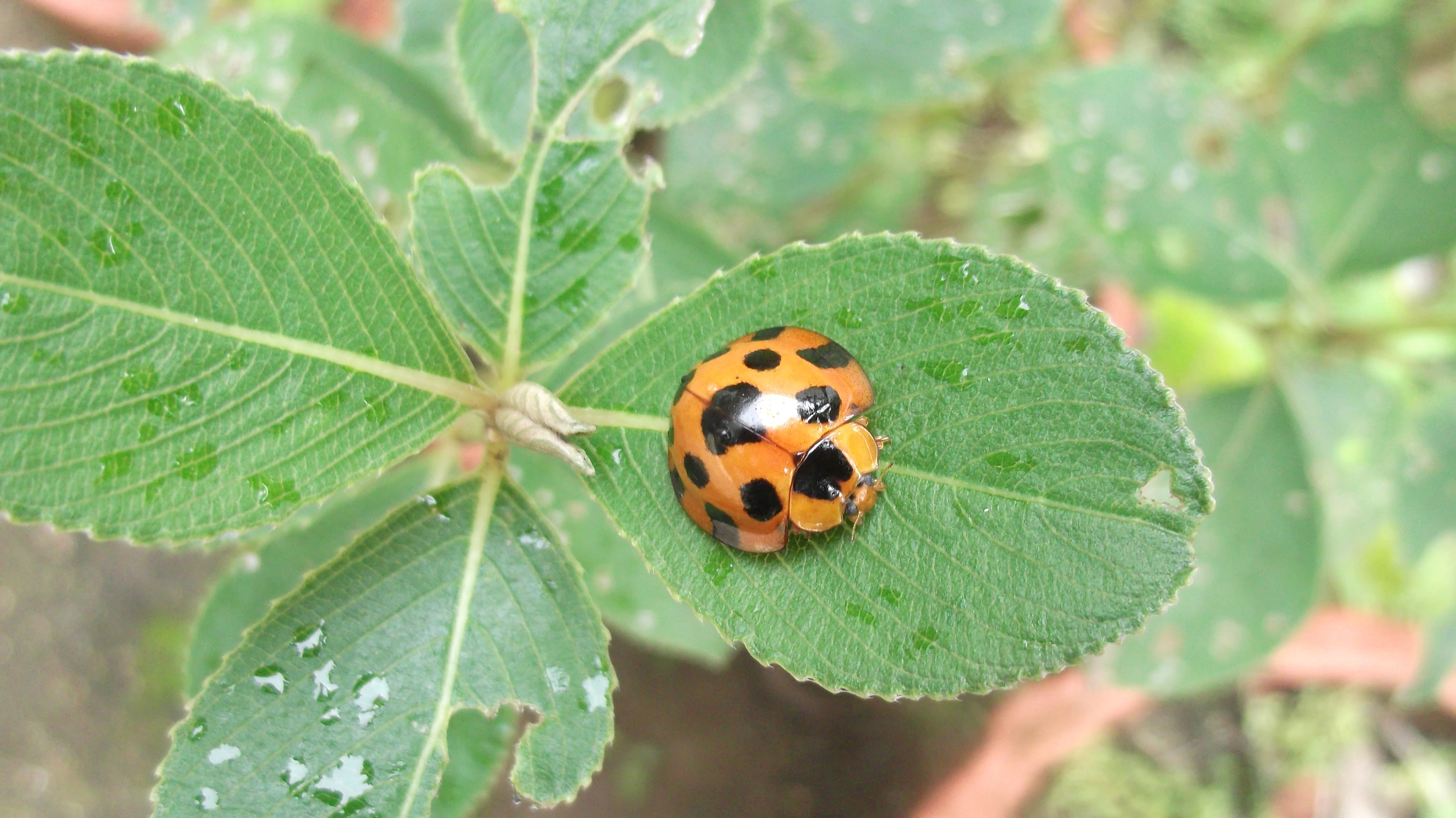
Synonycha grandis

=== Family: Cucujidae - Flat bark beetles ===
- Aulonosoma tenebrioides
- Cryptolestes divaricatus
- Cryptolestes ferrugineus
- Cryptolestes klapperichi
- Laemophloeus atratulus
- Laemophloeus coloratus
- Laemophloeus foveolatus
- Laemophloeus hypocrita
- Laemophloeus incertus
- Laemophloeus insinuans
- Narthecius bicolor
- Narthecius truncatipennis
- Notolaemus lewisi
- Passandra uniformis
- Placonotus orientalis
- Placonotus subtestaceus
- Placonotus torsus
- Xylolestes krombeini
- Xylolestes laevior
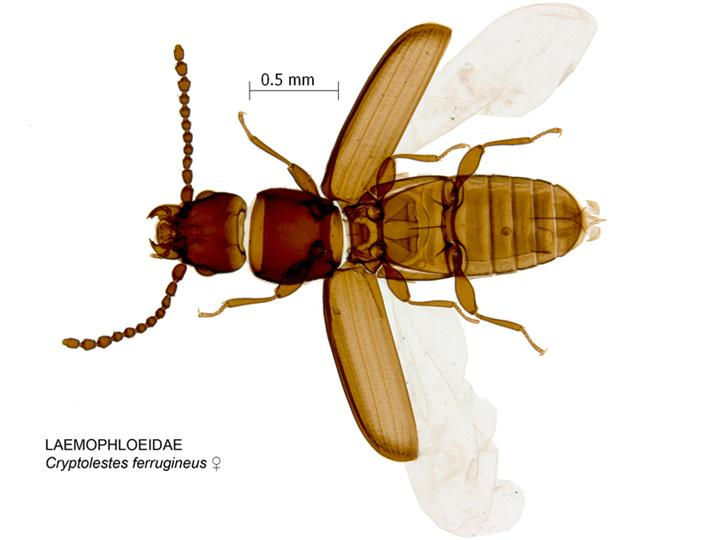
Cryptolestes ferrugineus

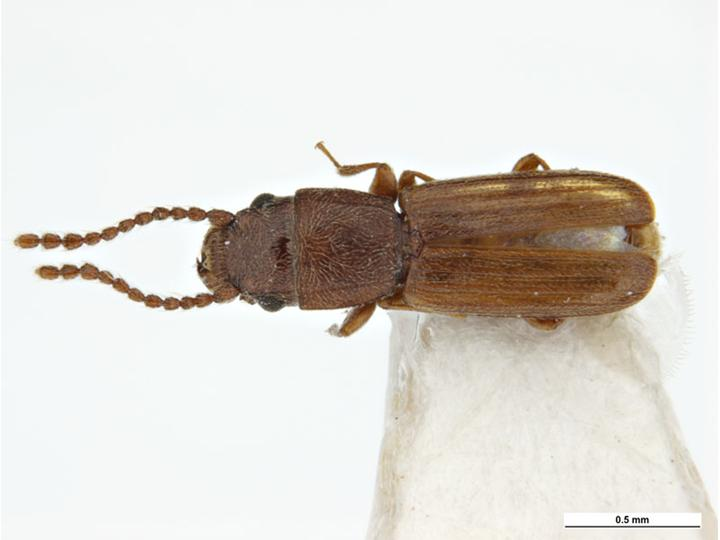
Cryptolestes klapperichi

=== Family: Curculionidae - True weevils and bark beetles ===
- Acacacis zeylanicus
- Acicnemis dorsonotata
- Acicnemis horni
- Acicnemis mansueta
- Acicnemis reversa
- Aclees birmanus
- Alcidodes comptus
- Alcidodes erosus
- Alcidodes fornicatus
- Alcidodes lugubris
- Alcidodes magnificus
- Alcidodes notabilis
- Alcidodes texatus
- Alcidodes virgatus
- Amasa doliaris
- Ambrosiodmus asperatus
- Amphialus agrestis
- Amphialus communicans
- Amphialus descriminans
- Amphialus turgidus
- Amphorygma ceylonensis
- Arixyleborus granulifer
- Arixyleborus malayensis
- Arixyleborus mediosectus
- Arixyleborus rugosipes
- Astycus aequalis
- Astycus apicatus
- Astycus armatipes
- Astycus bilineatus
- Astycus canus
- Astycus cinereus
- Astycus cinnamomeus
- Astycus horni
- Astycus immunis
- Astycus lewisi
- Astycus suturalis
- Atinella senex
- Balaninus c-album
- Blosyrus inaequalis
- Camptorrhinus reversa
- Cleonus arenarius
- Cleonus gyllenhali
- Cleonus ophinotus
- Cleonus zebra
- Cnestus gravidus
- Cnestus magnus
- Cnestus mutilatus
- Coccotrypes advena
- Coccotrypes cyperi
- Coccotrypes flavicornis
- Coccotrypes rugicollis
- Coccotrypes theae
- Coccotrypes variabilis
- Coccotrypes vulgaris
- Coptodryas tenella
- Cosmopolites sordidus
- Cossonus disciferus
- Cossonus divisus
- Cossonus hebes
- Cossonus horni
- Craniodicticus mucronatus
- Cratopus sinhalensis
- Crossotarsus minor
- Crossotarsus saundersi
- Cryphalogenes euphorbiae
- Cryphalogenes exiguus
- Cryphalomorphus opacus
- Cryphalops capucinus
- Cryphalops quadridens
- Cryphalus fuliginosus
- Cryphalus neglectus
- Cryphalus nigricans
- Cryphalus palawanus
- Cryphalus subvestitus
- Cryphalus tetricus
- Cryphalus vestitus
- Cryptorhynchus assimilans
- Cryptorhynchus declaratus
- Curculio arenarius
- Curculio c-album
- Curculio curvicornis
- Curculio dentifer
- Curculio lineolatus
- Curculio lugubris
- Curculio motschulskyi
- Curculio rufimanus
- Cyrtotrachelus rufopectinipes
- Dacryophthorus brincki
- Debus emarginatus
- Dendroctonomorphus muricatus
- Dereodus mastos
- Dereodus sparsus
- Desmidophorinus fasciculicollis
- Diamerus curvifer
- Diocalandra subfasciatus
- Diuncus haberkorni
- Dryocoetes taprobanus
- Dryophthorus setulosus
- Eccoptopterus spinosus
- Epicalus virgatus
- Episomus figuratus
- Episomus fimbriatus
- Episomus pyriformis
- Euwallacea bicolor
- Euwallacea dilatatiformis
- Euwallacea fornicatior
- Euwallacea fornicatus
- Euwallacea interjectus
- Euwallacea perbrevis
- Euwallacea piceus
- Euwallacea similis
- Exilis horni
- Ficicis despectus
- Genyocerus albipennis
- Hyledius regalis
- Hylurgus concinnulus
- Hypoborus ficus
- Hypocryphalus cylindripennis
- Hypocryphalus glabratus
- Hypocryphalus interponens
- Hypocryphalus mangiferae
- Hypothenemus areccae
- Hypothenemus bicinctus
- Hypothenemus eruditus
- Hypothenemus externedentatus
- Hypothenemus seriatus
- Ischnopus taprobanus
- Liparthrum brincki
- Macrorhyncolus crassitarsis
- Mechistocerus assimilans
- Mechistocerus declaratus
- Megarrhinus cingalensis
- Mesites subvittatus
- Mesites suturalis
- Myllocerus angulatipes
- Myllocerus canescens
- Myllocerus curvicornis
- Myllocerus delicatulus
- Myllocerus dentifer
- Myllocerus discolor
- Myllocerus equinus
- Myllocerus fringilla
- Myllocerus retratiens
- Myllocerus subfasciatus
- Myllocerus transmarinus
- Myllocerus undatus
- Myllocerus undecimpustulatus
- Myllocerus variegatus
- Myllocerus viridanus
- Myllocerus zeylanicus
- Myocalandra exarata
- Nassophasis foveata
- Nassophasis pictipes
- Neodiamerus granulicollis
- Niphades vexatus
- Odoiporus longicollis
- Odontobarus hodiernus
- Omotemnus introducens
- Omphasus nalandae
- Orthosinus salutarius
- Orthosinus velatus
- Otidognathus meridionalis
- Oxydema fusiforme
- Peltotrachelus ovis
- Pentarthrum wollastoni
- Pentoxydema rostralis
- Phaenomerus sundevalli
- Phloeoditica curtus
- Phloeophagosoma atratum
- Phloeophagosoma morio
- Phloeophagus cossonoides
- Phloeosinus detersus
- Phloeotrogus obliquecaudata
- Phrygena ephippiata
- Piazomias aequalis
- Piazomias immunis
- Platypus furcatus
- Platypus latifinis
- Platypus rotundicauda
- Platyrrhinus marmoratus
- Platytrachelus ovis
- Polytus mellerborgi
- Prodioctes haematicus
- Prodioctes singhalensis
- Psilosomus hebes
- Ptilopodius ceylonicus
- Ptochus imbricatus
- Ptochus limbatus
- Ptochus planoculis
- Ptochus pyriformis
- Rhabdocnemis maculata
- Rhinoncus paganus
- Rhynchaenus c-album
- Rhynchophorus ferrugineus
- Rhyncolus ater
- Rhyncolus cossonoides
- Rhyncolus linearis
- Rhyncolus taciturnus
- Scolytomimus dilutus
- Scolytomimus mimusopis
- Scolytomimus rectus
- Sipalinus gigas
- Sitona ambiguus
- Sitophilus exarata
- Sitophilus mellerborgi
- Sitophilus subfasciatus
- Sphaerotrypes cristatus
- Sphaerotrypes ranasinghei
- Sphenophorus maculata
- Sphenophorus planipennis
- Sphenophorus sordidus
- Stereotribus incisus
- Stereotribus tuberculifrons
- Strattis biguttatus
- Strattis srilankaiensis
- Strattis vestigialis
- Strophosomus suturalis
- Sueus niisimai
- Sympiezomias kraatzi
- Tanymecus curviscapus
- Treptoplatypus solidus
- Trigonocolus cingalensis
- Trochorhopalus discifer
- Trochorhopalus leucogrammus
- Tylodes semicollis
- Webbia ceylonae
- Xerodermus porcellus
- Xyleborinus andrewesi
- Xyleborinus exiguus
- Xyleborus affinis
- Xyleborus costipennis
- Xyleborus cristatuloides
- Xyleborus cuneolosus
- Xyleborus dilatatiformis
- Xyleborus figuratus
- Xyleborus insitivus
- Xyleborus perforans
- Xyleborus pseudocitri
- Xyleborus rimulosus
- Xyleborus seminitens
- Xylosandrus arquatus
- Xylosandrus compactus
- Xylosandrus crassiusculus
- Xylosandrus discolor
- Xylosandrus mancus
- Xylosandrus morigerus
- Xylosandrus pygmaeus
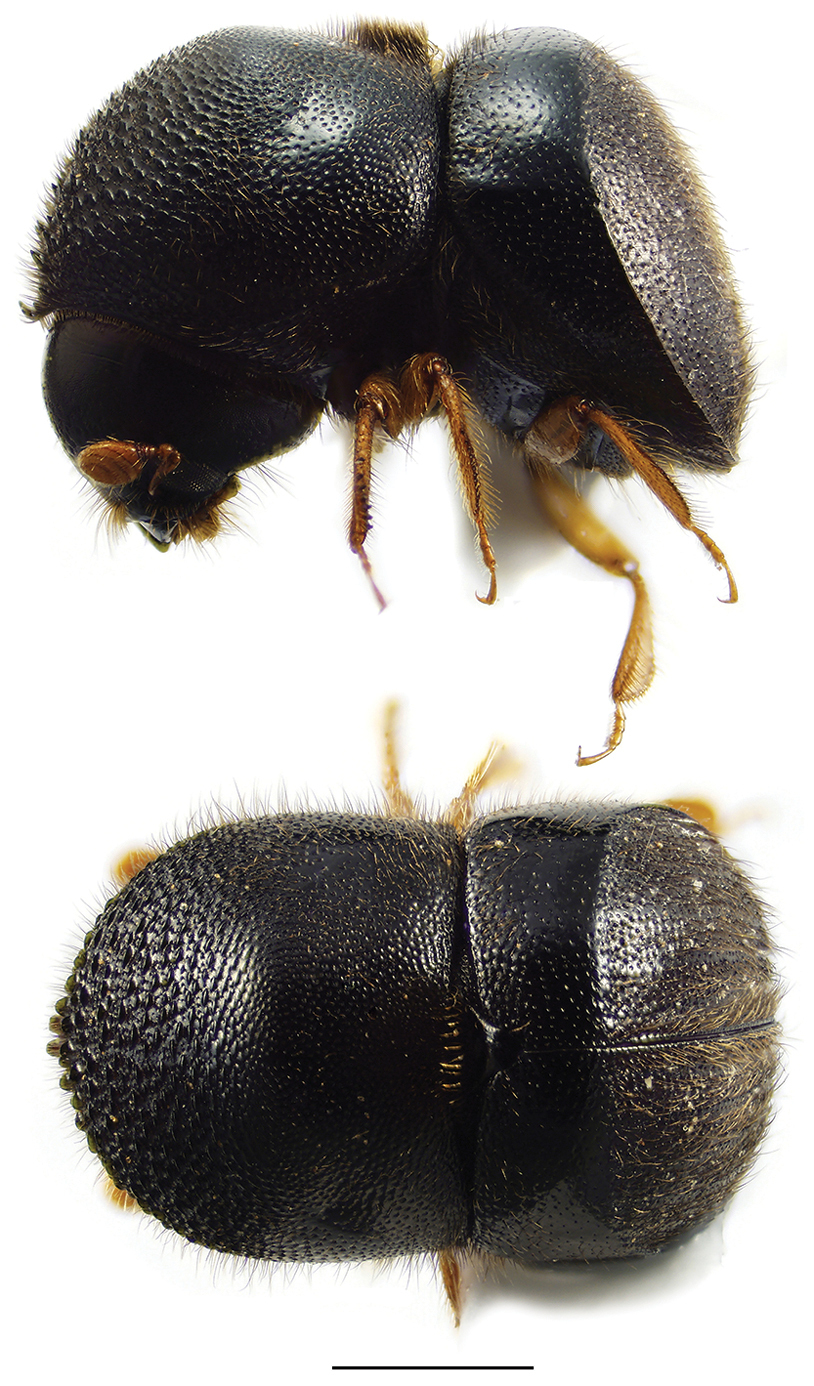
Cnestus mutilatus

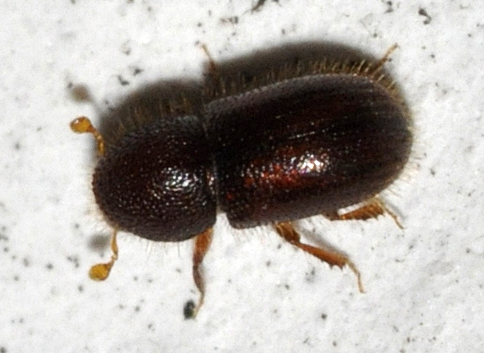
Coccotrypes cyperi

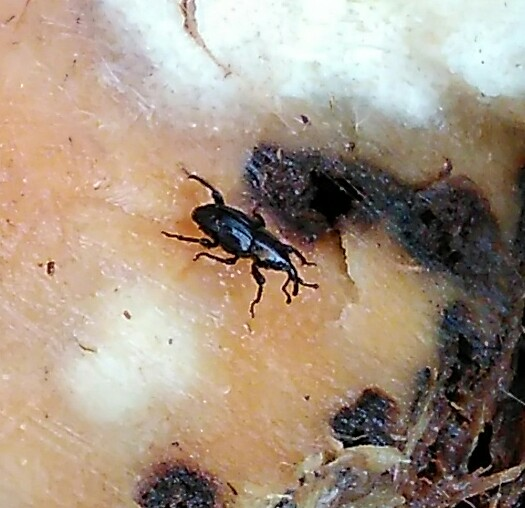
Cosmopolites sordidus

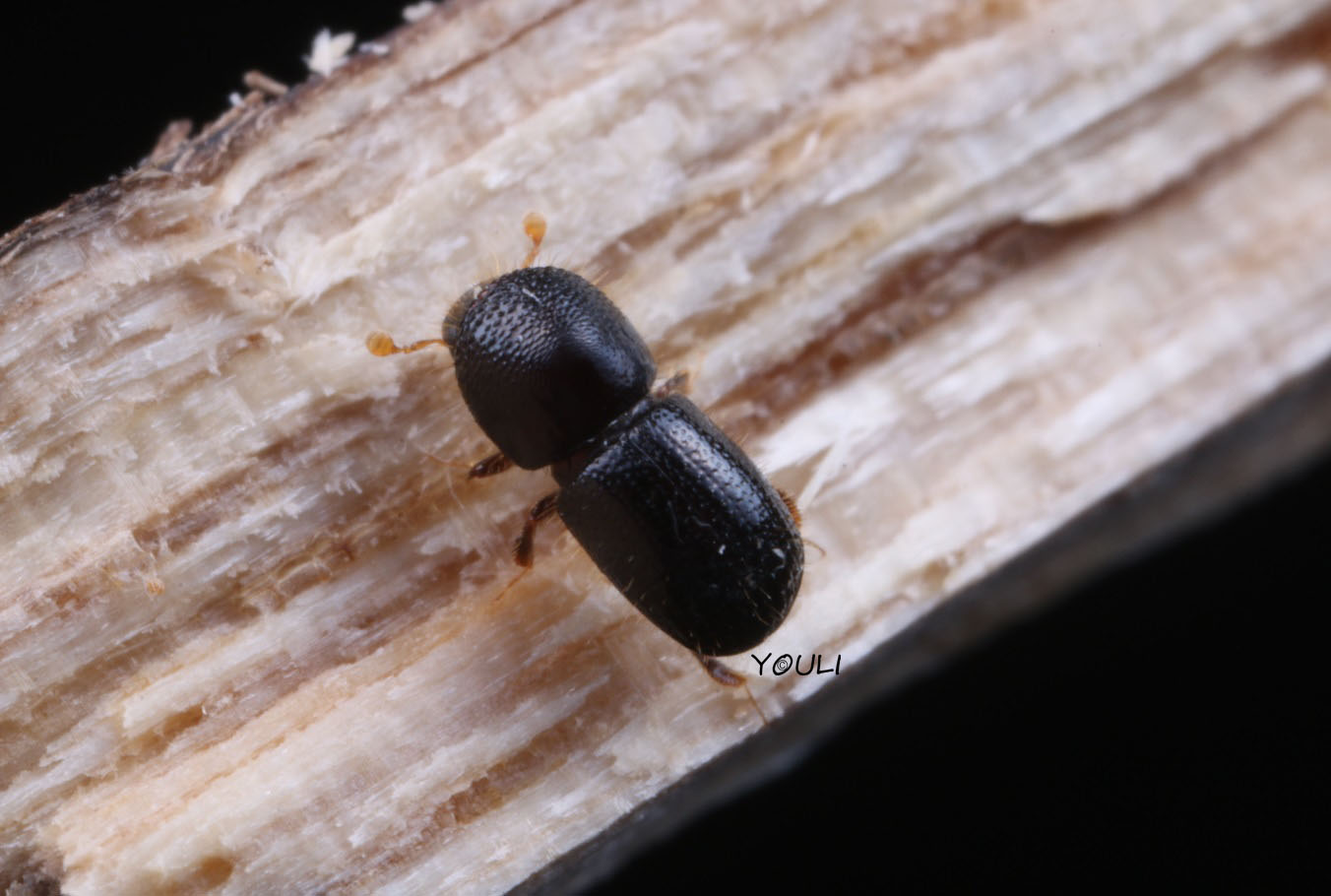
Euwallacea fornicatus

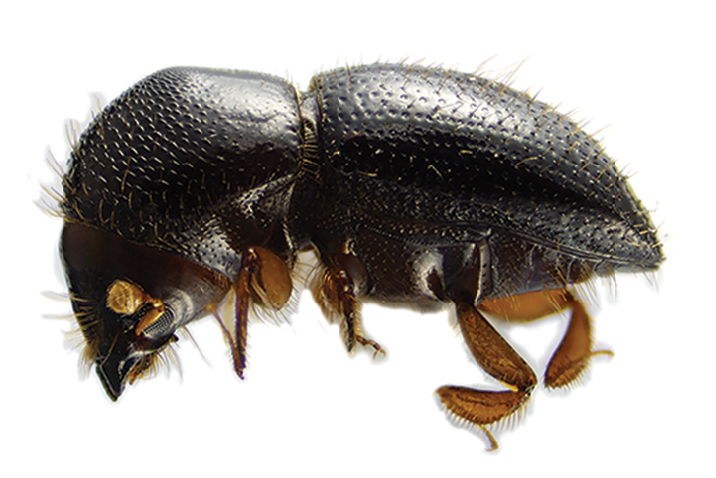
Euwallacea interjectus

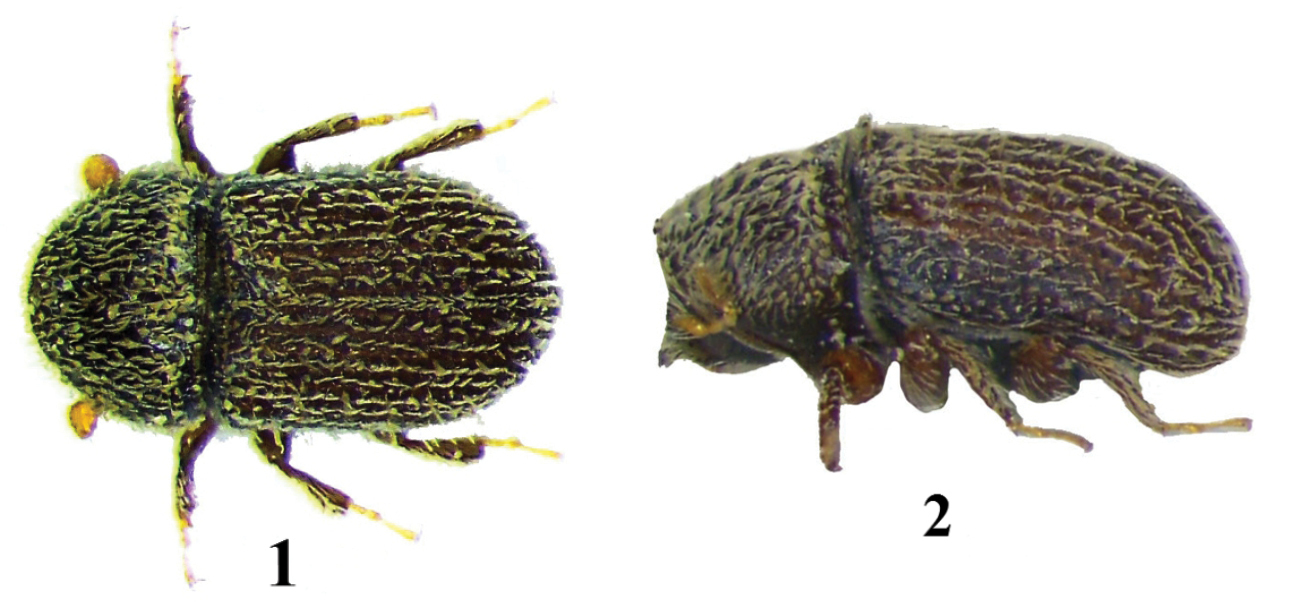
Hypoborus ficus

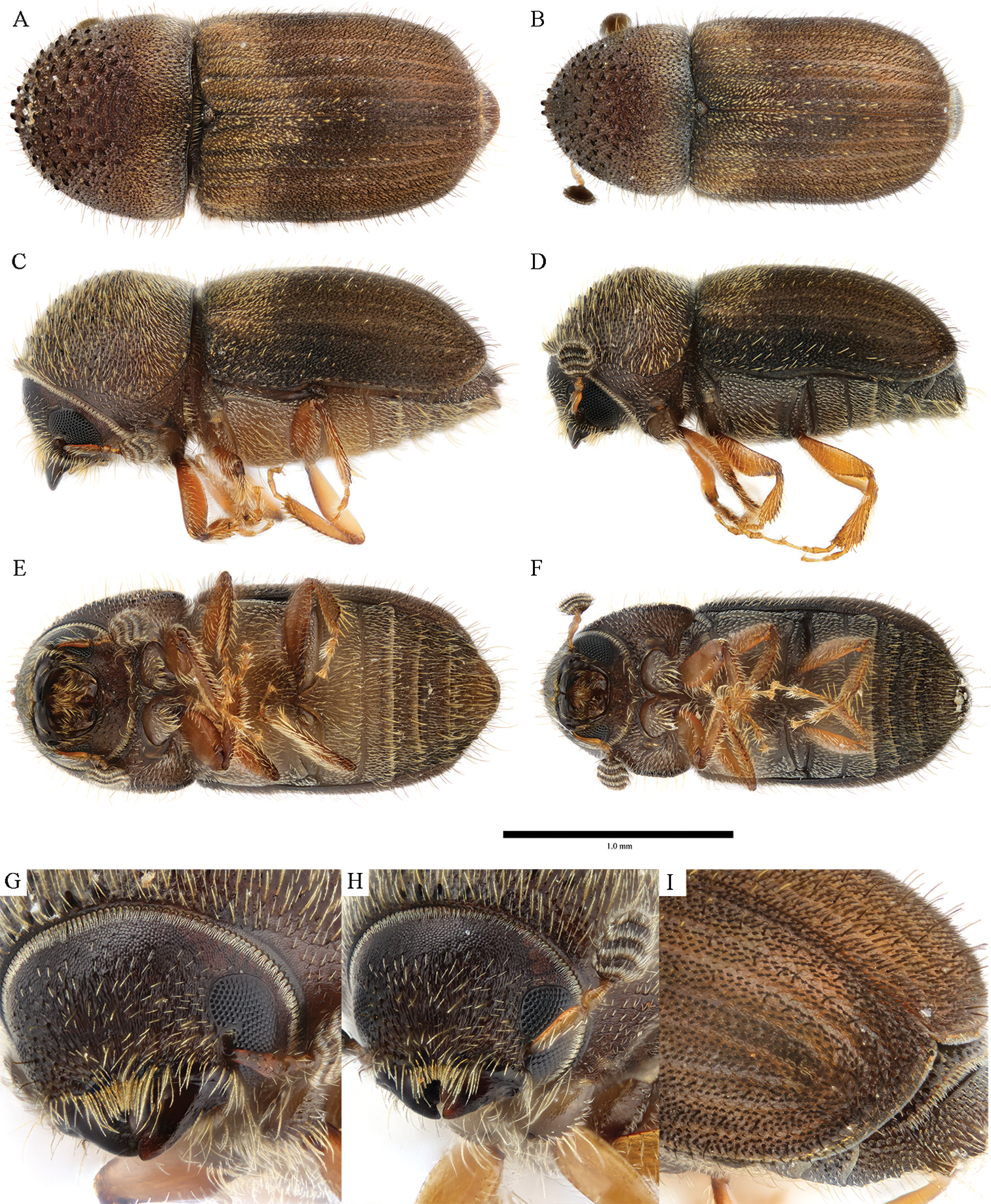
Cryphalus mangiferae

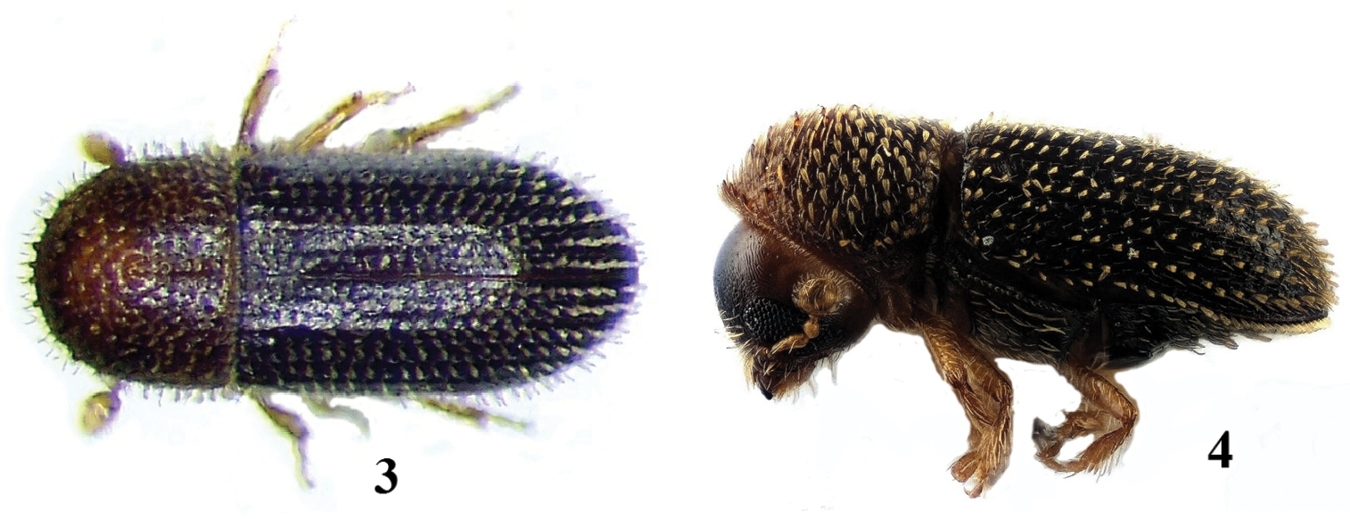
Hypothenemus eruditus

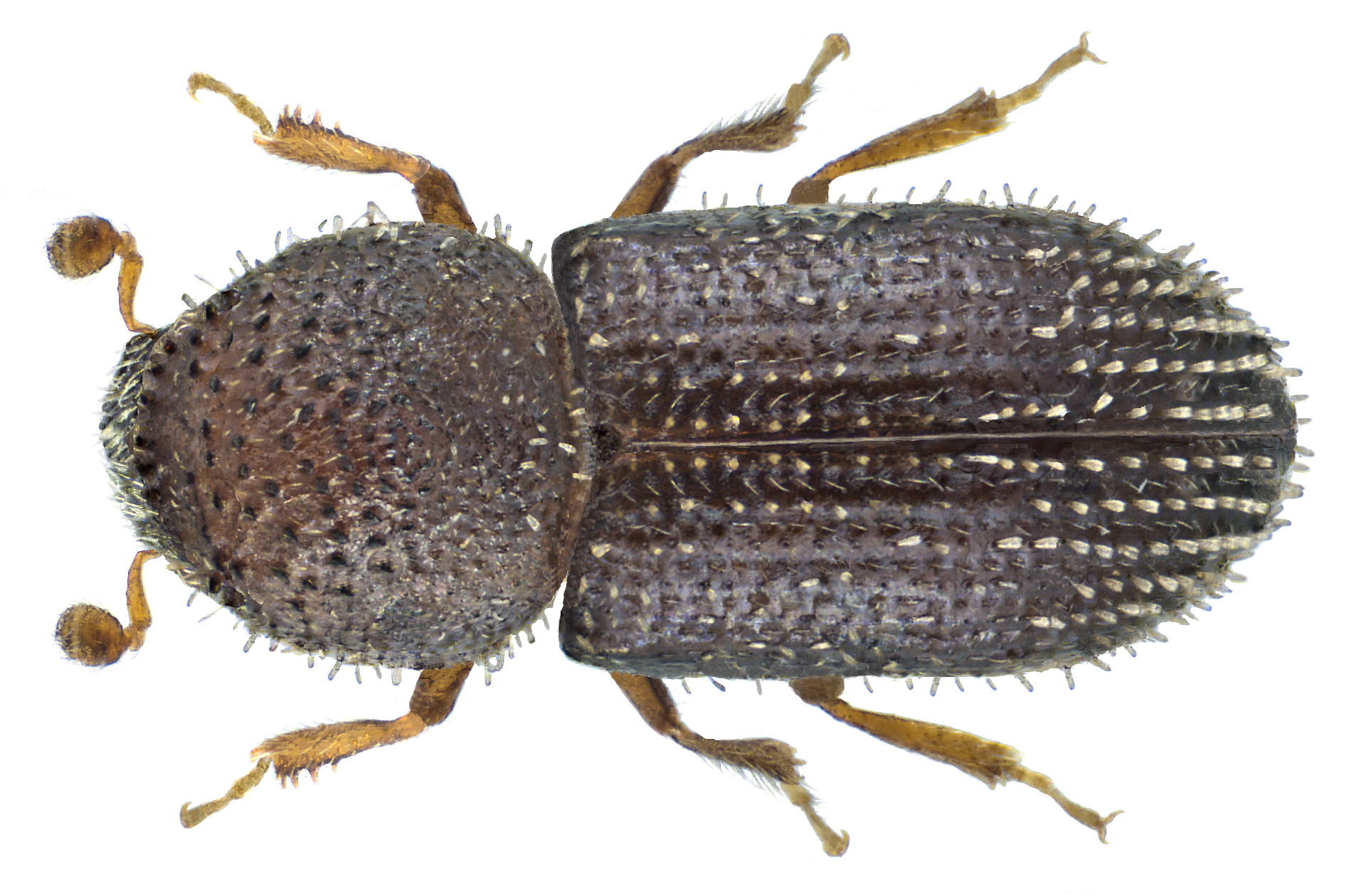
Hypothenemus seriatus

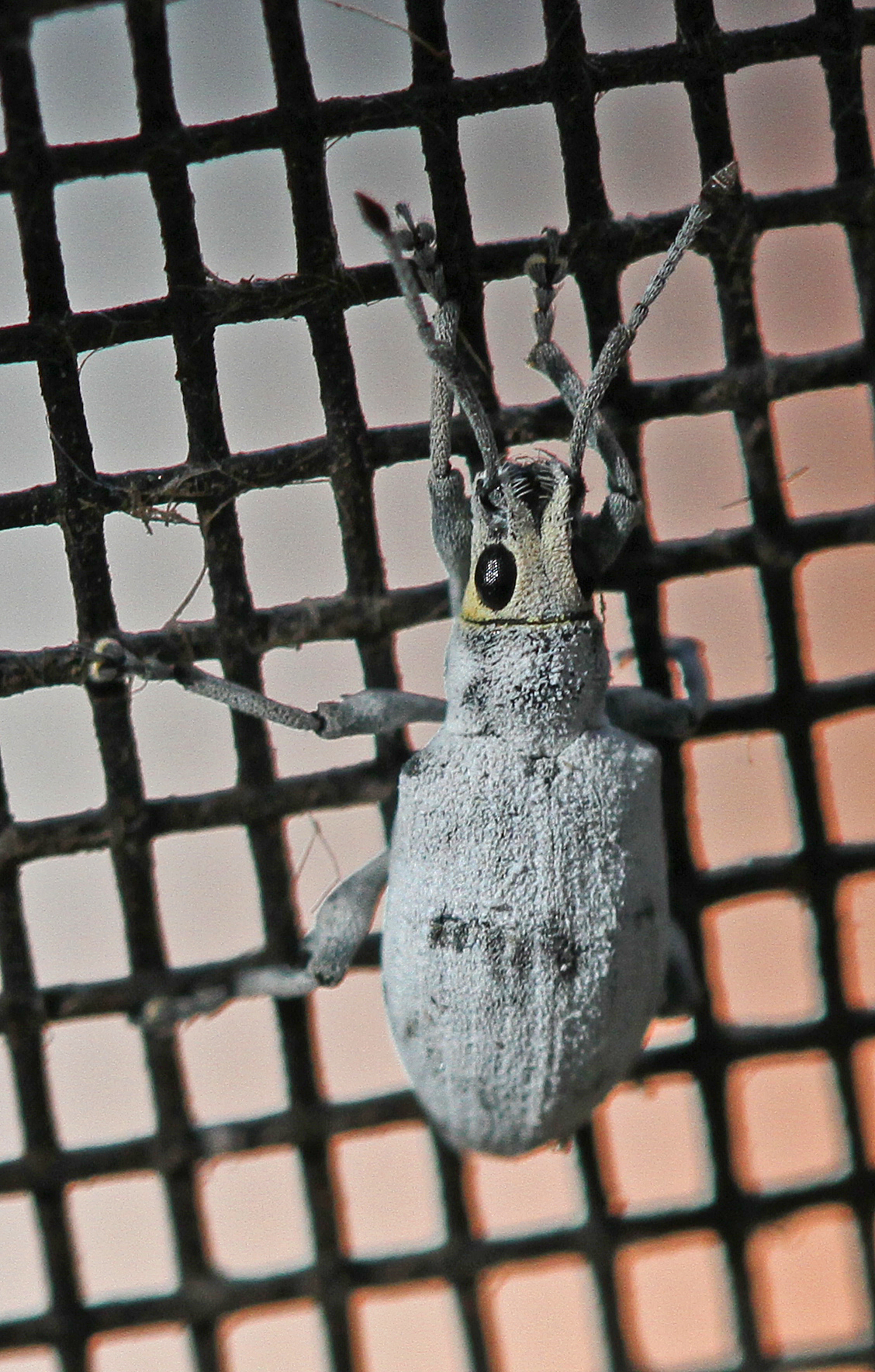
Myllocerus undecimpustulatus

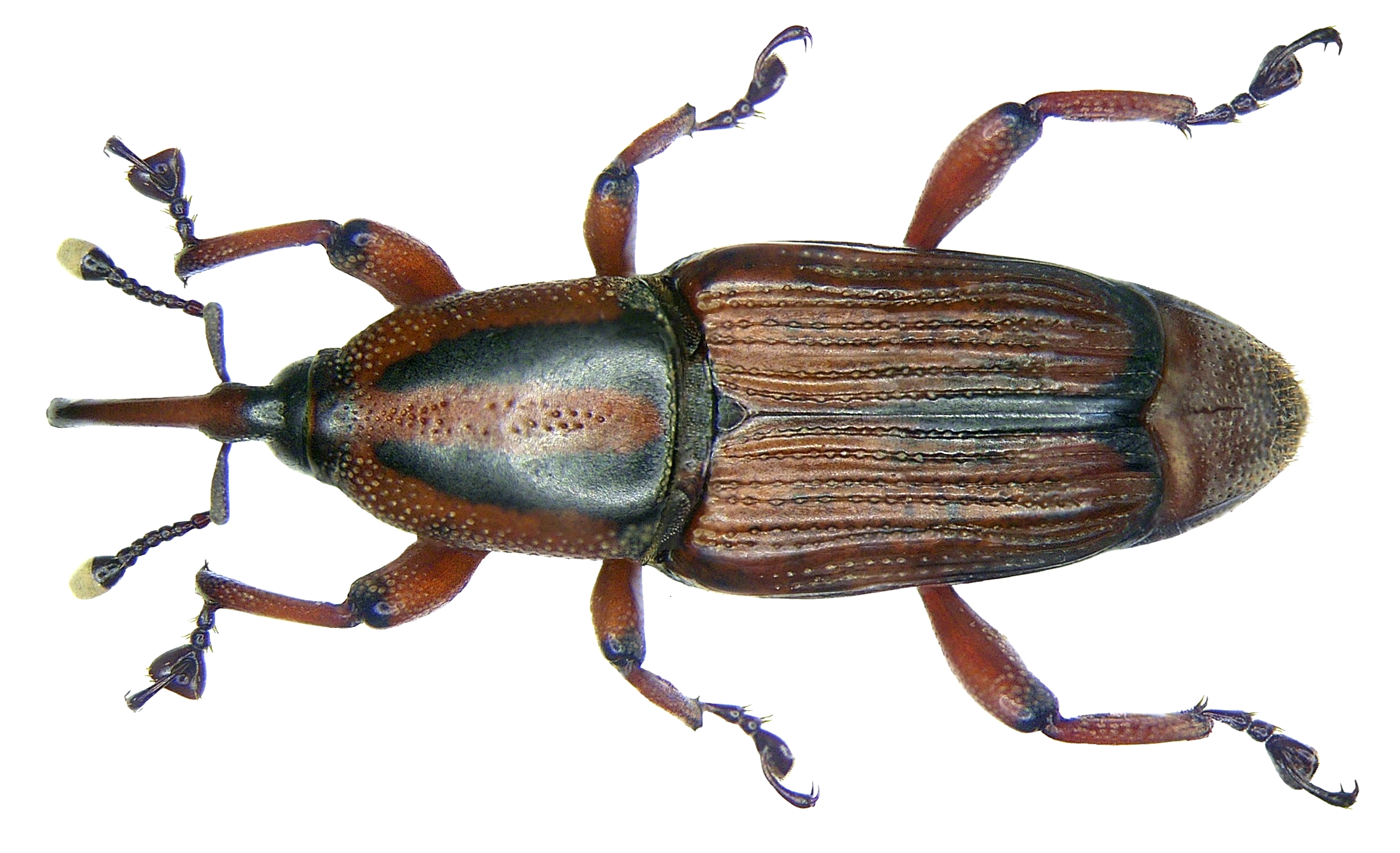
Odoiporus longicollis

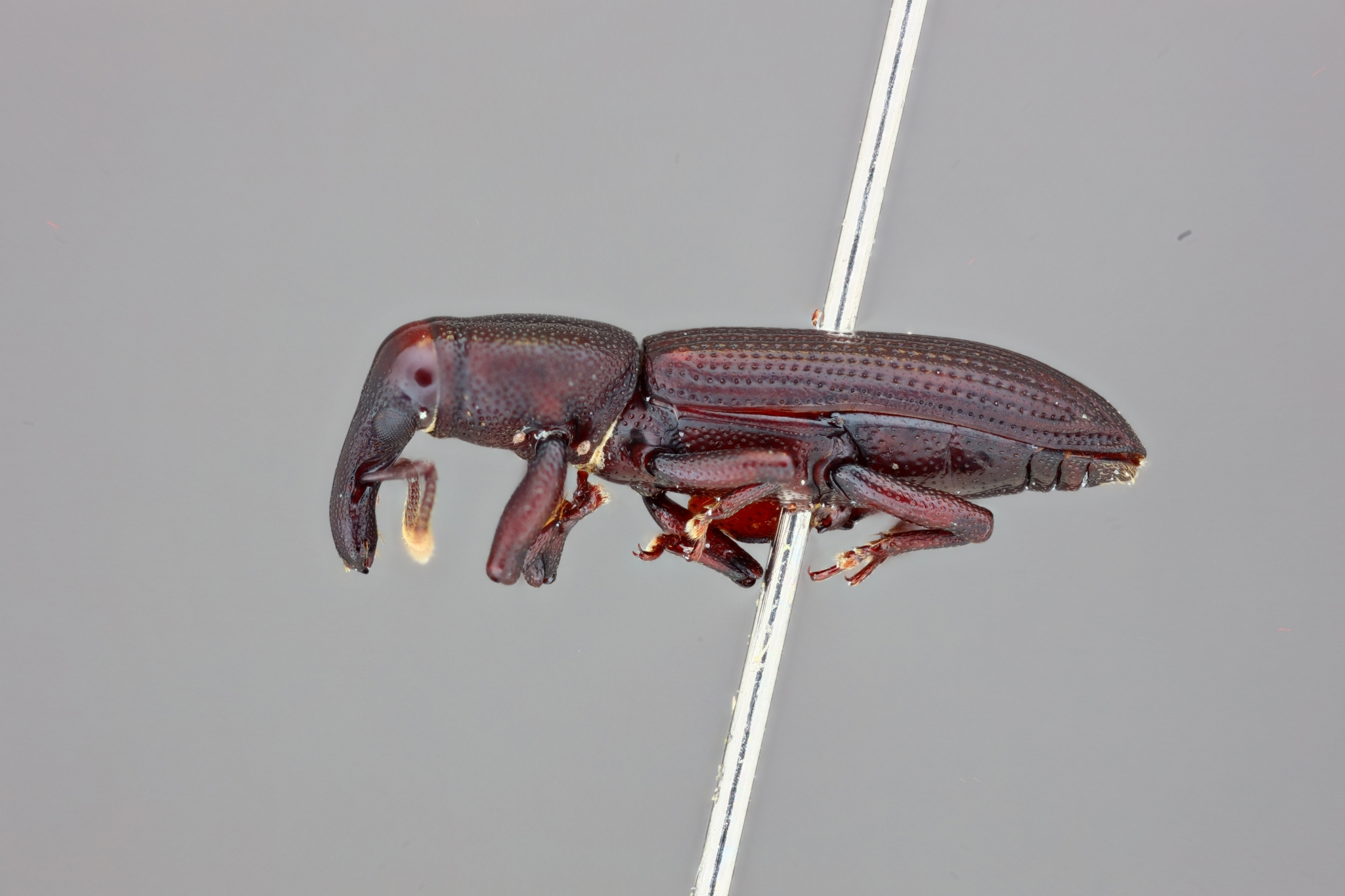
Oxydema fusiforme

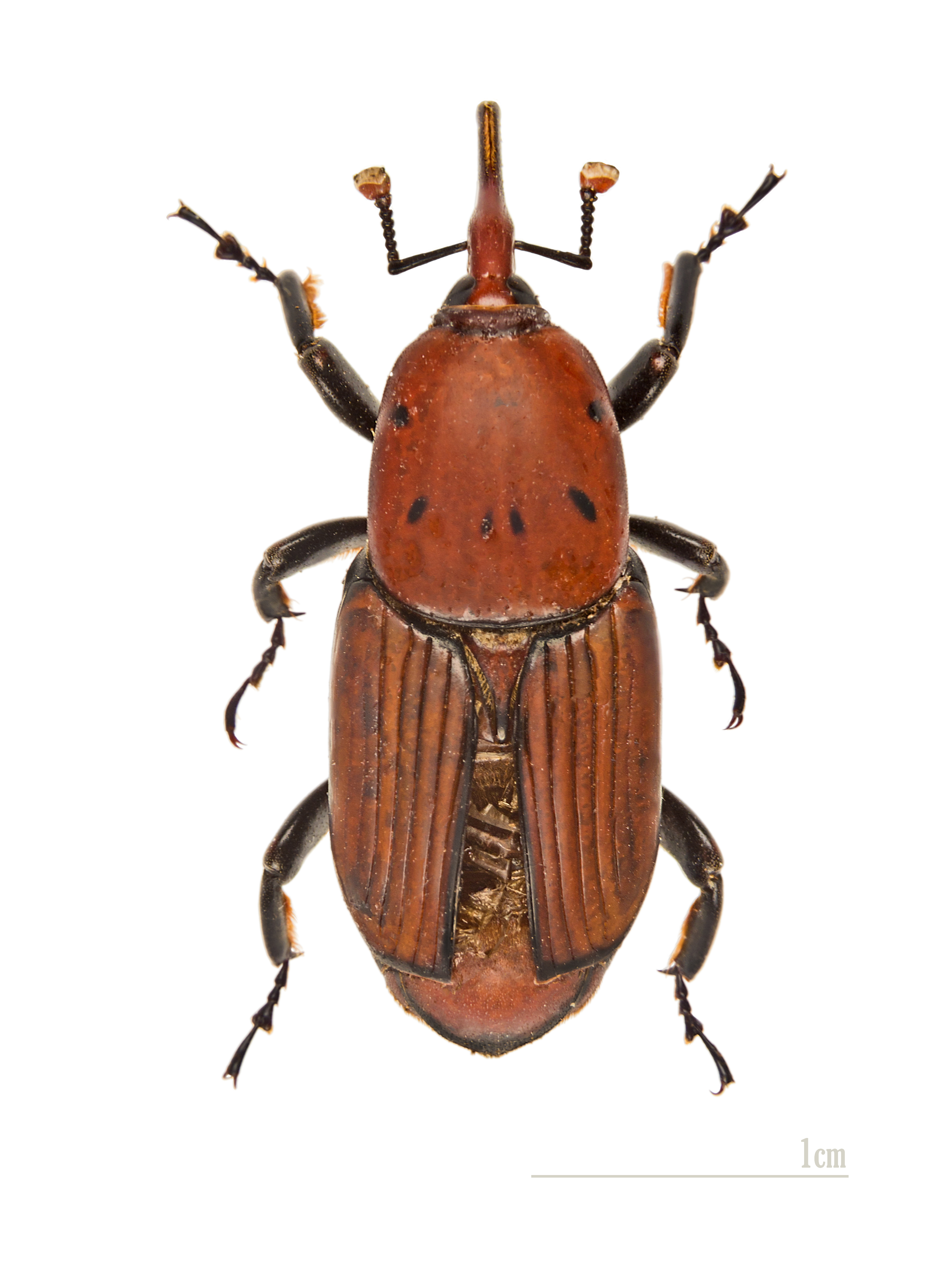
Rhynchophorus ferrugineus

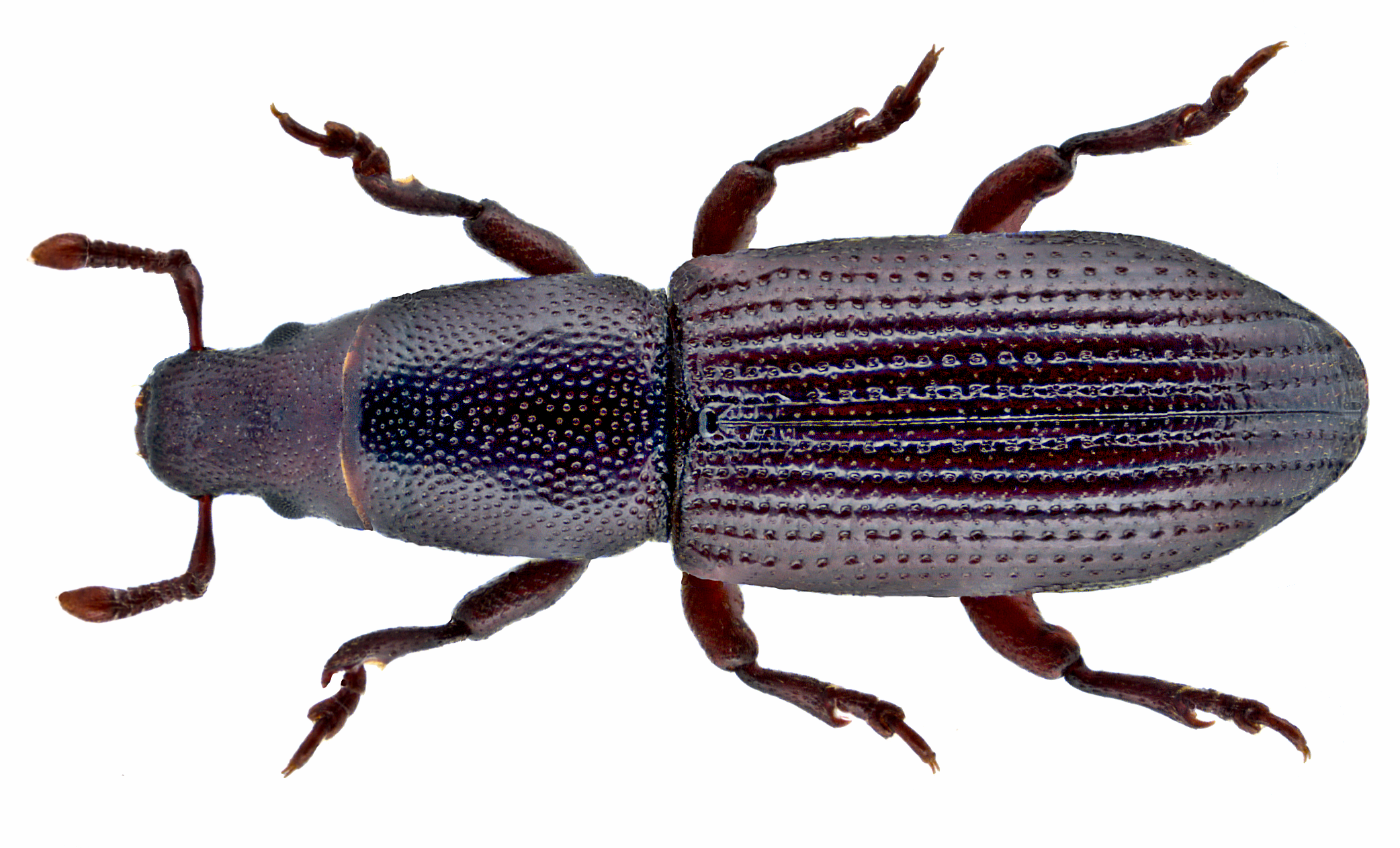
Rhyncolus ater

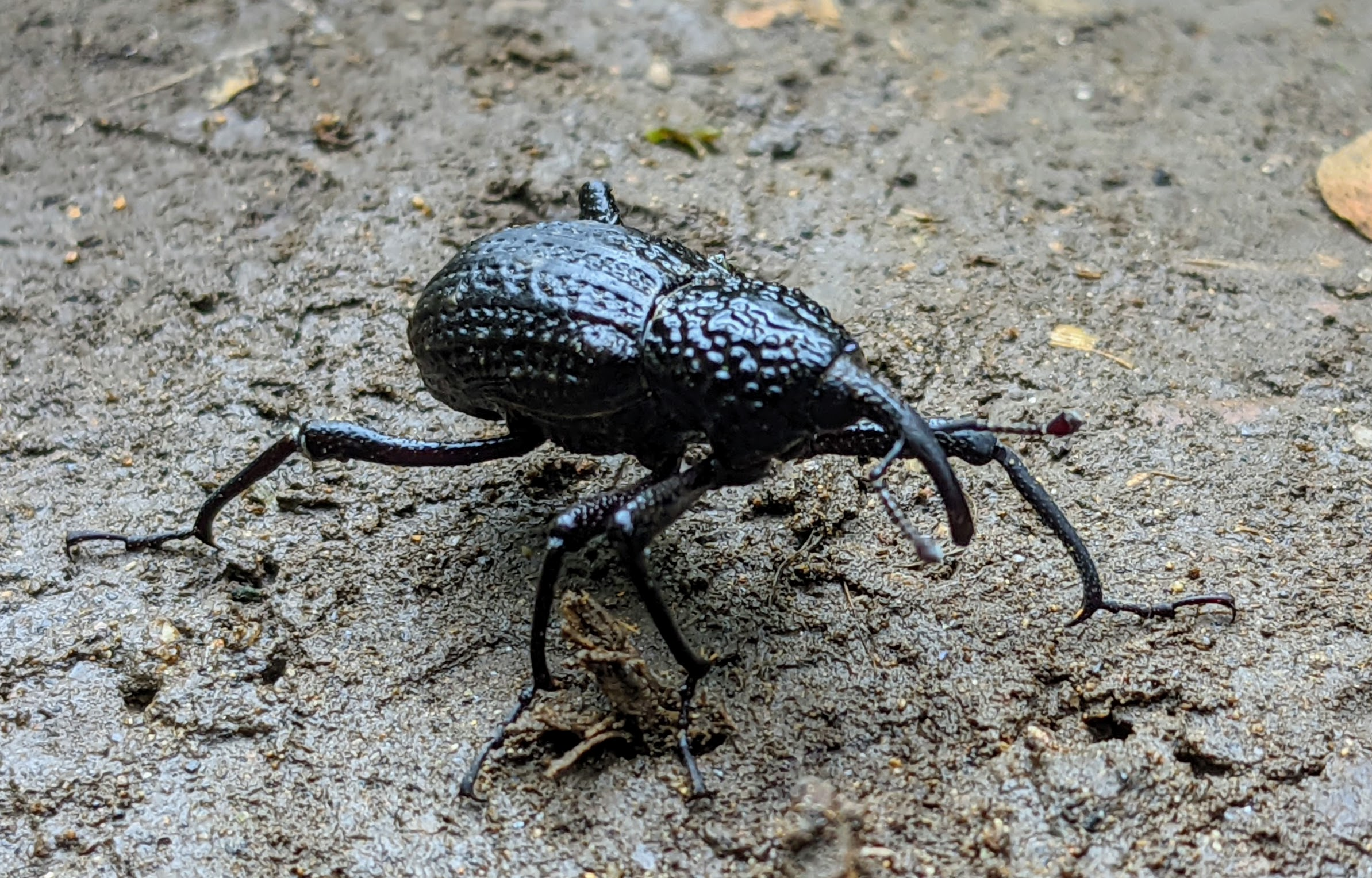
Sipalinus gigas

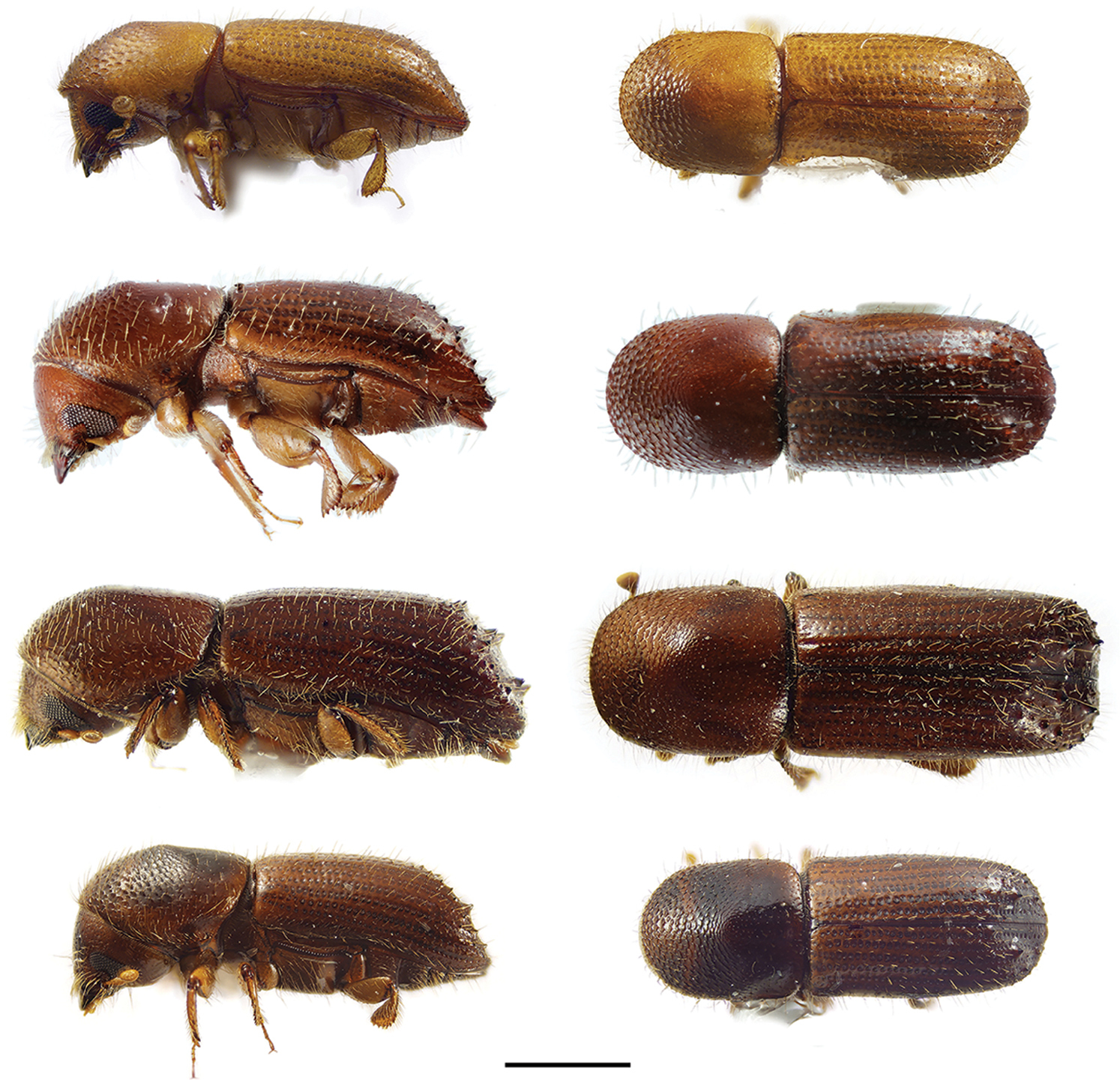
Xyleborus affinis

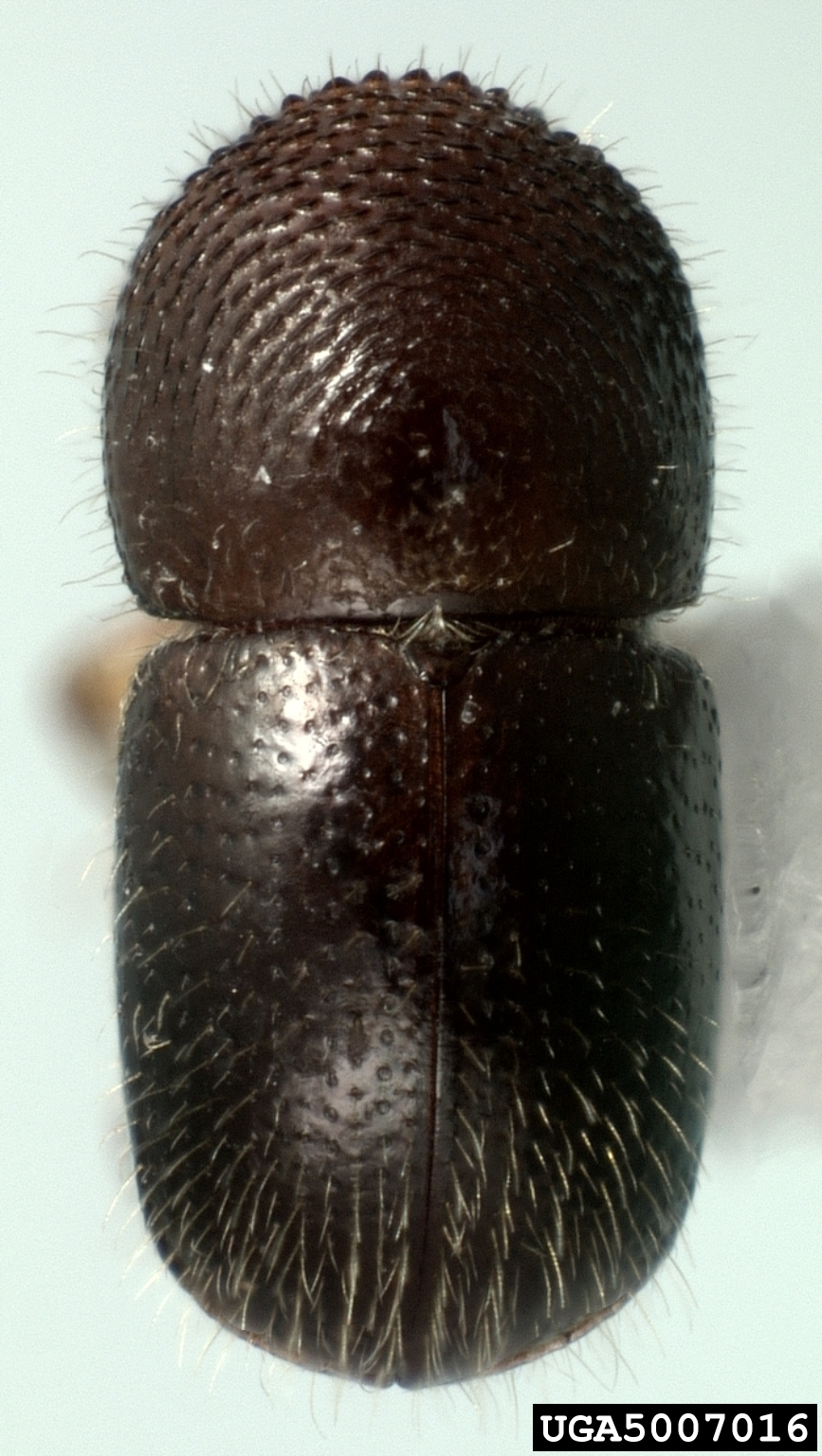
Xylosandrus compactus

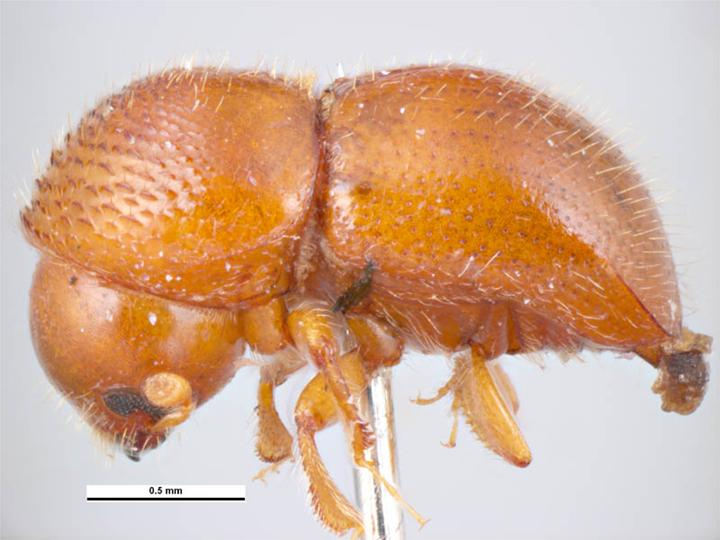
Xylosandrus morigerus

=== Family: Dermestidae - Skin beetles ===
- Anthrenus ceylonicus
- Anthrenus oceanicus
- Attagenus undulatus
- Evorinea hirtella
- Orphinus fulvipes
- Orphinus funestus
- Orphinus guernei
- Orphinus minor
- Orphinus tabitha
- Thaumaglossa pici
- Thaumaglossa tonkinea
- Trinodes cinereohirtus
- Trinodes emarginatus
- Trogoderma granarium
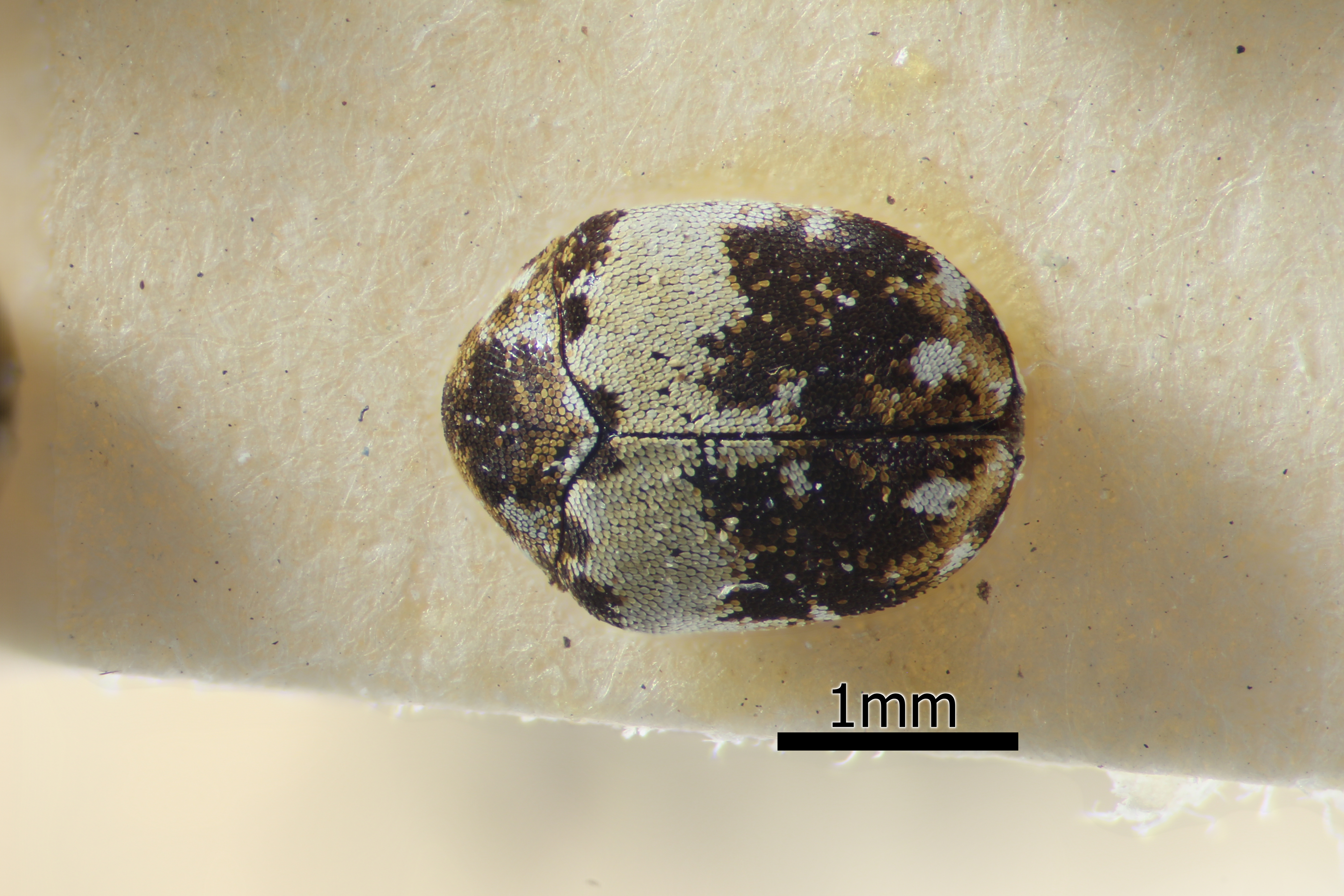
Anthrenus oceanicus

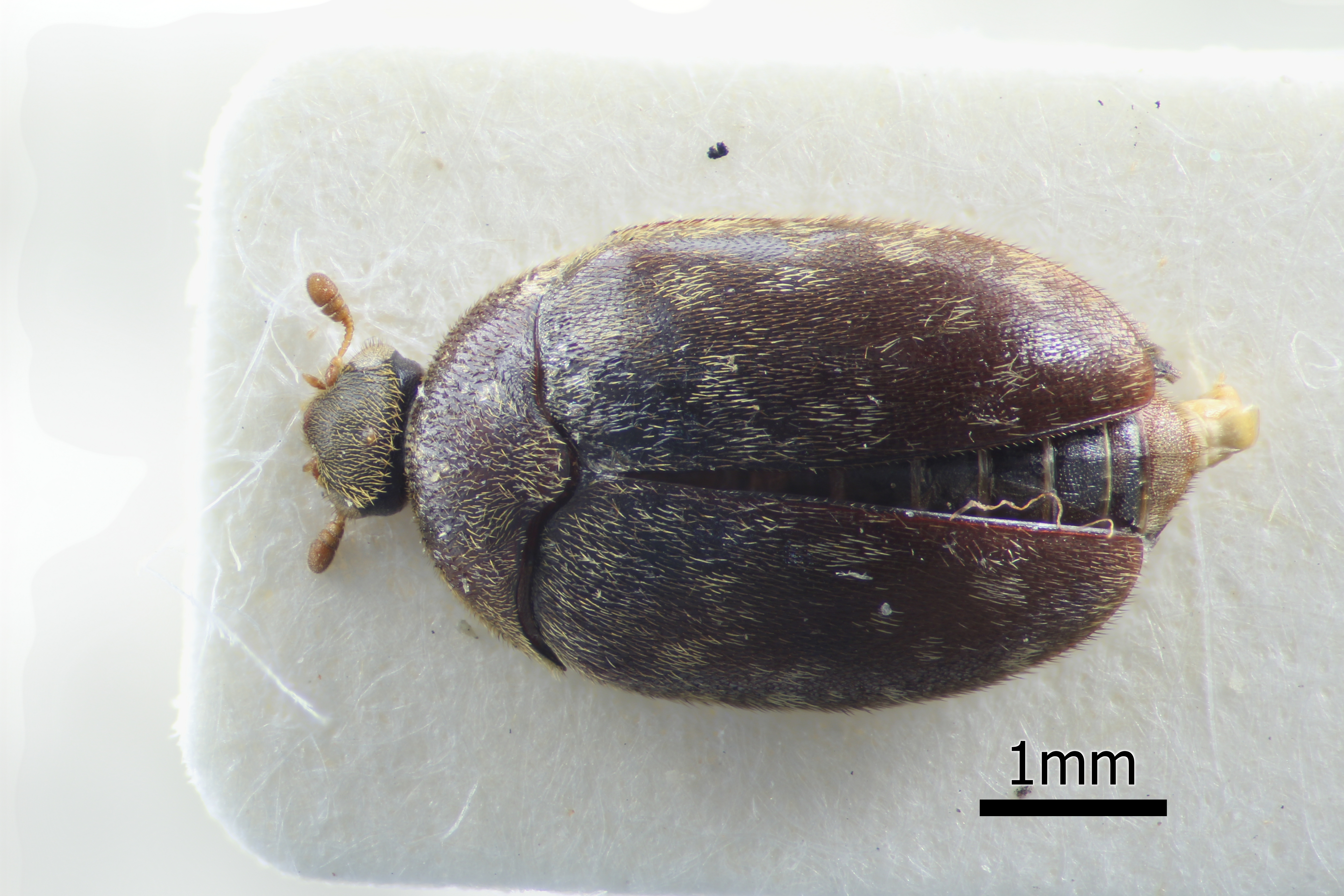
Attagenus undulatus

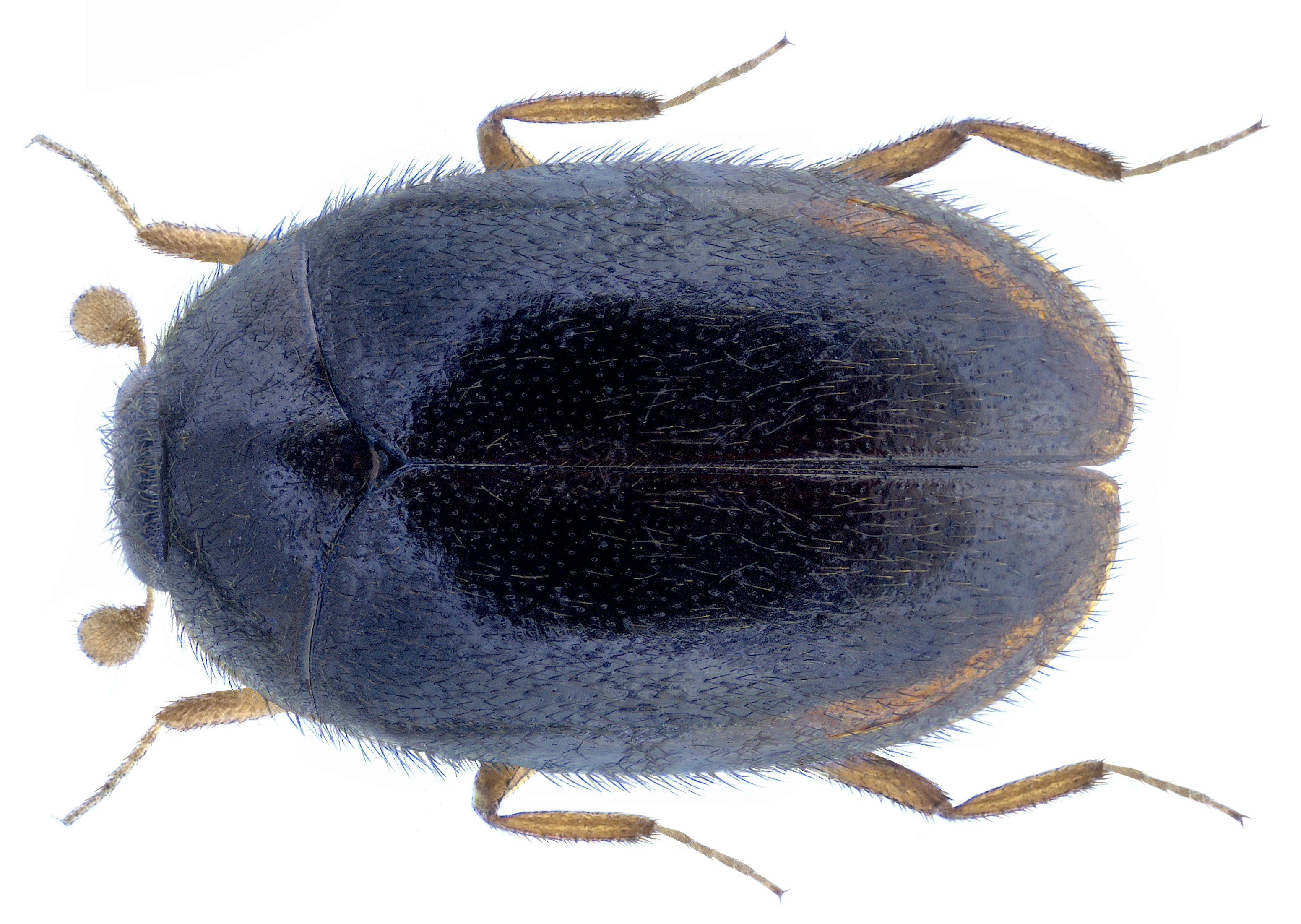
Orphinus fulvipes

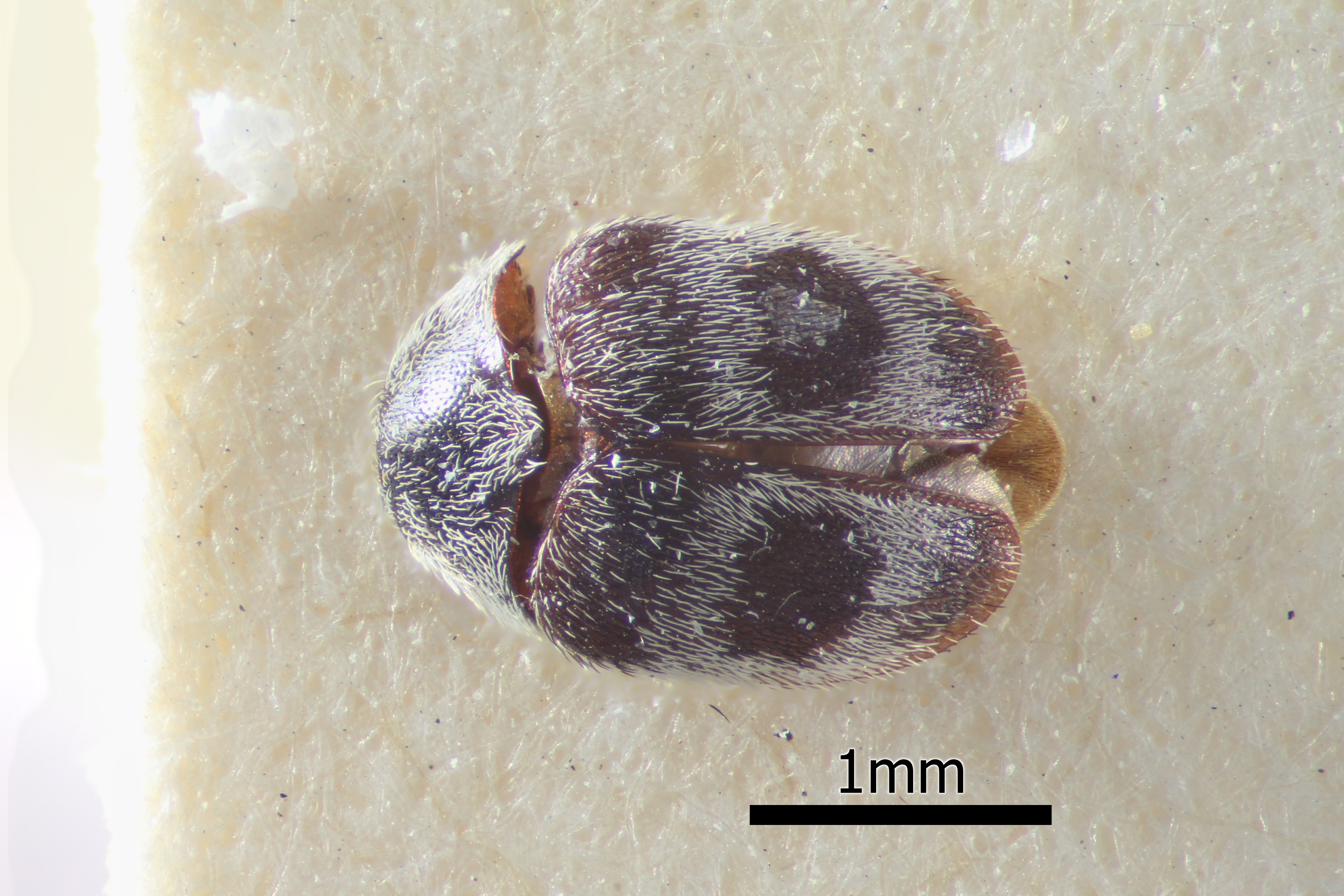
Thaumaglossa pici

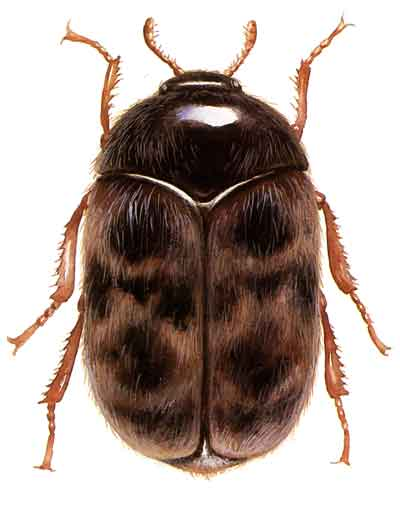
Trogoderma granarium

=== Family: Discolomatidae ===
- Aphanocephalus lewisi
- Aphanocephalus pellitus
- Aphanocephalus rufinus
- Aphanocephalus saundersi
- Parafallia simoni

=== Family: Dryopidae - Long-toed water beetles ===
- Ceradryops punctatus
- Elmomorphus naviculus
- Helichus naviculus

=== Family: Dytiscidae - Predaceous diving beetles ===
- Clypeodytes bufo
- Clypeodytes dilutus
- Copelatus freudei
- Copelatus irinus
- Copelatus mahleri
- Copelatus mysorensis
- Copelatus neelumae
- Copelatus schereri
- Copelatus taprobanicus
- Copelatus tenebrosus
- Cybister cardoni
- Cybister confusus
- Cybister dejeanii
- Cybister extenuans
- Cybister javanus
- Cybister prolixus
- Cybister sugillatus
- Cybister tripunctatus
- Cybister ventralis
- Eretes sticticus
- Herophydrus musicus
- Hydaticus fabricii
- Hydaticus fractifer
- Hydaticus incertus
- Hydaticus luczonicus
- Hydaticus pacificus
- Hydaticus ricinus
- Hydaticus satoi
- Hydaticus vittatus
- Hydroglyphus flammulatus
- Hydroglyphus flaviculus
- Hydroglyphus inconstans
- Hydrovatus acuminatus
- Hydrovatus bonvouloiri
- Hydrovatus castaneus
- Hydrovatus confertus
- Hydrovatus ischyrus
- Hydrovatus obtusus
- Hydrovatus picipennis
- Hydrovatus rufoniger
- Hydrovatus seminarius
- Hydrovatus sinister
- Hydrovatus subrotundatus
- Hydrovatus subtilis
- Hyphoporus interpulsus
- Hyphoporus nilghiricus
- Hyphoporus pugnator
- Hyphydrus intermixtus
- Hyphydrus lyratus
- Hyphydrus renardi
- Lacconectus simoni
- Lacconectus spangleri
- Laccophilus anticatus
- Laccophilus ceylonicus
- Laccophilus ellipticus
- Laccophilus flexuosus
- Laccophilus guttalis
- Laccophilus inefficiens
- Laccophilus parvulus
- Laccophilus sharpi
- Laccophilus uniformis
- Laccophilus wolfei
- Leiodytes griseoguttatus
- Microdytes maculatus
- Neptosternus ceylonicus
- Neptosternus sinharajaicus
- Neptosternus starmuehlneri
- Neptosternus taprobanicus
- Pseuduvarus vitticollis
- Rhantus interclusus
- Rhantus taprobanicus
- Sandracottus festivus
- Sandracottus jaechi
- Uvarus livens
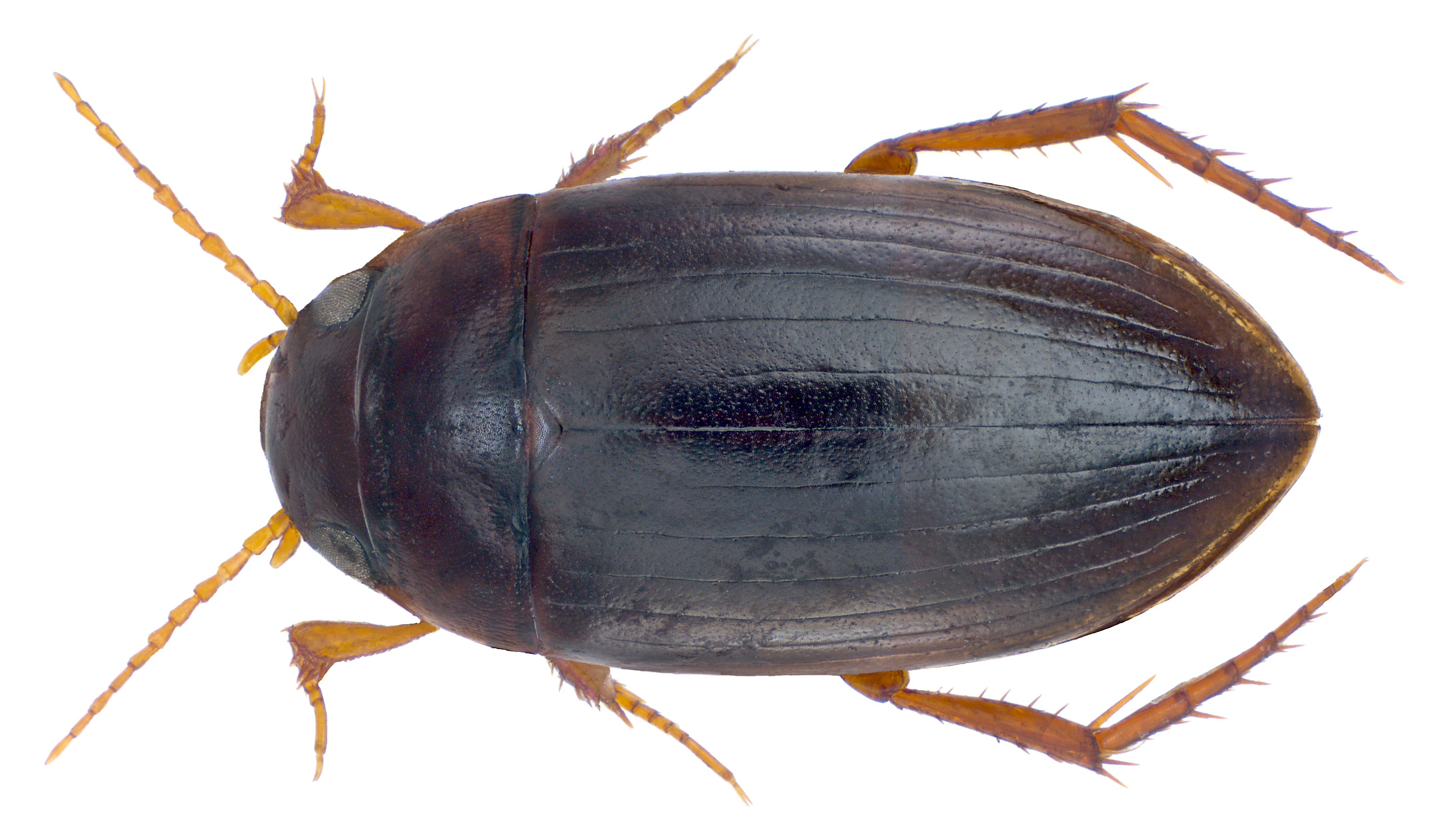
Copelatus tenebrosus

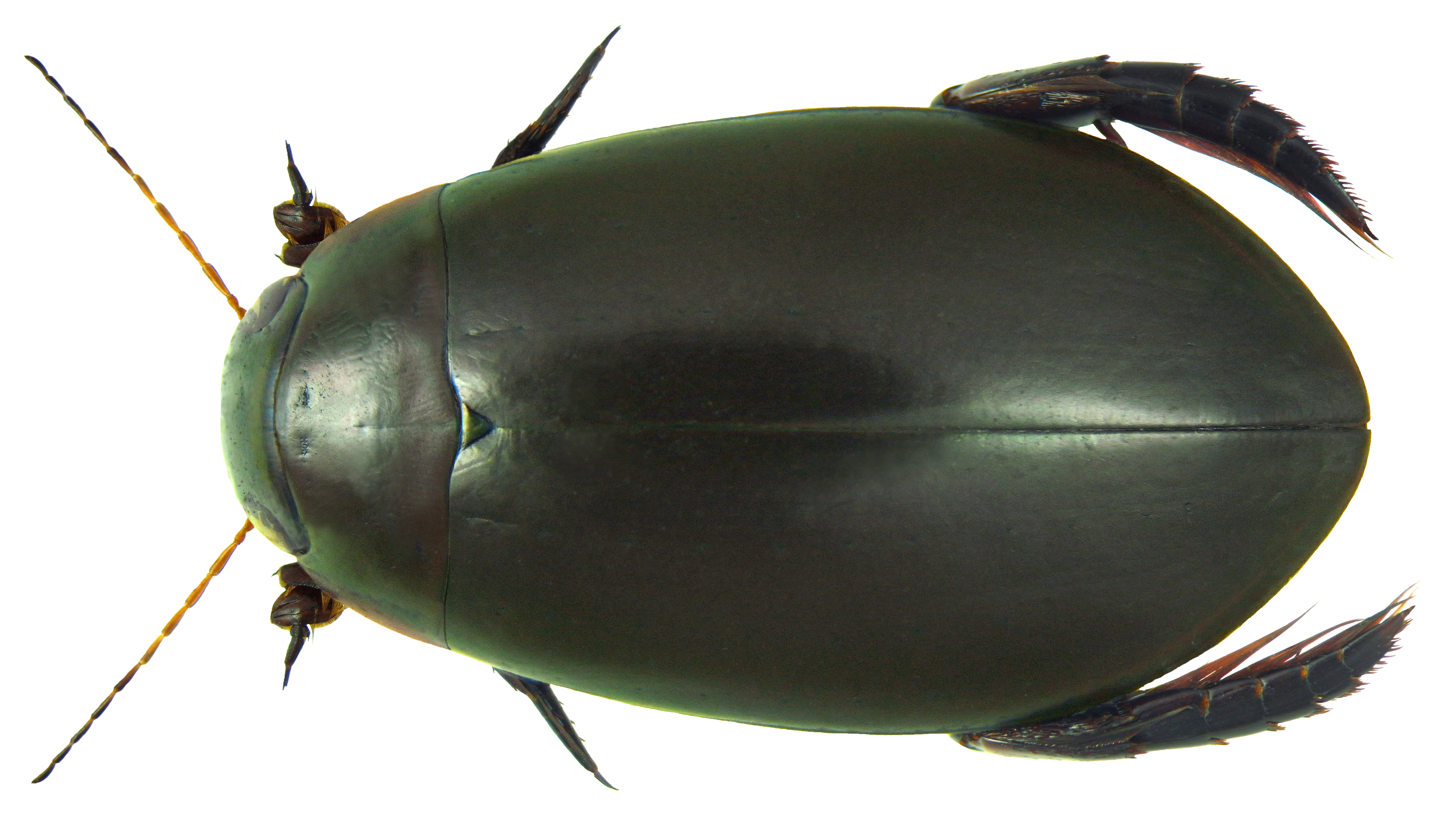
Cybister sugillatus

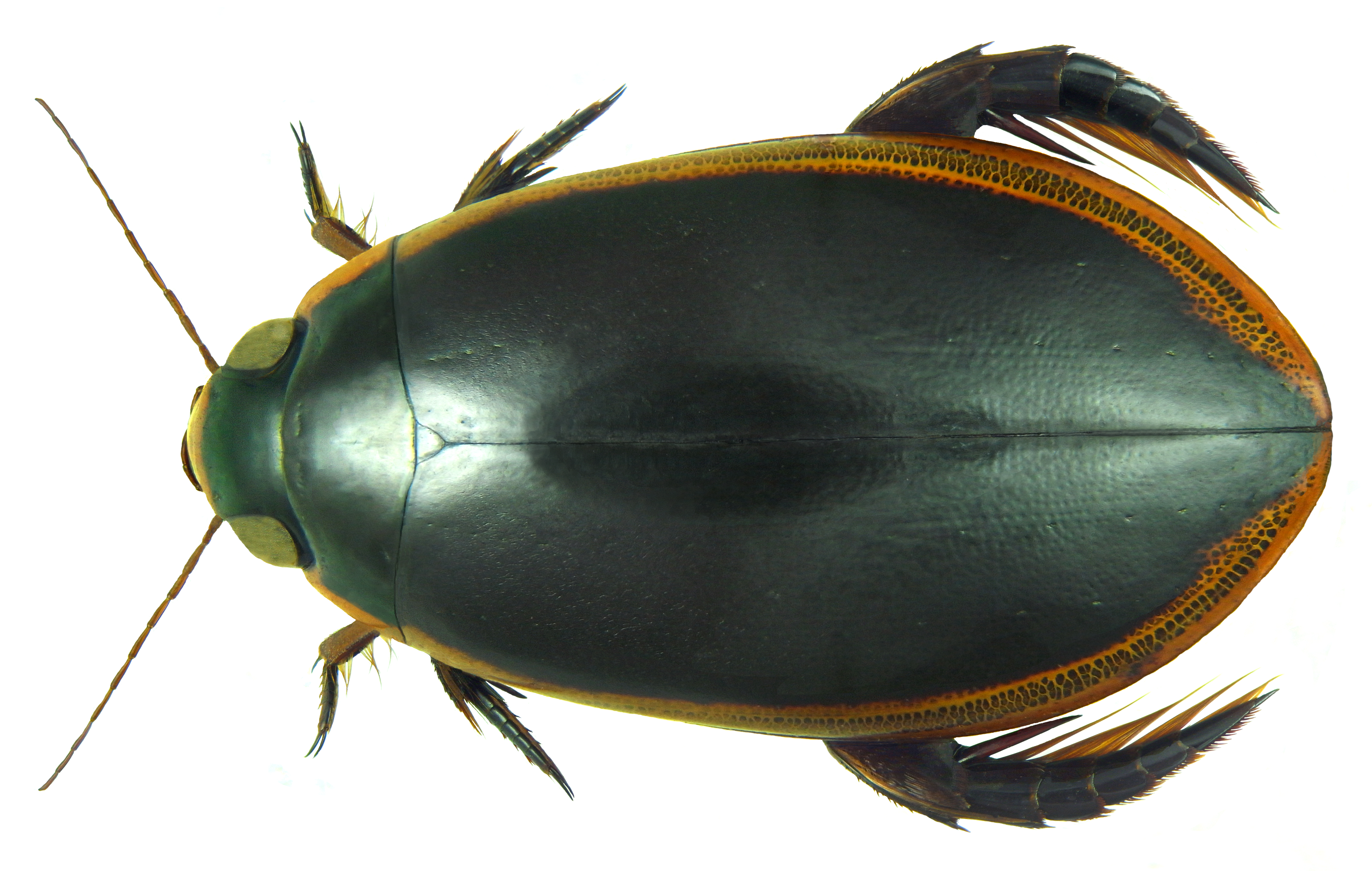
Cybister tripunctatus

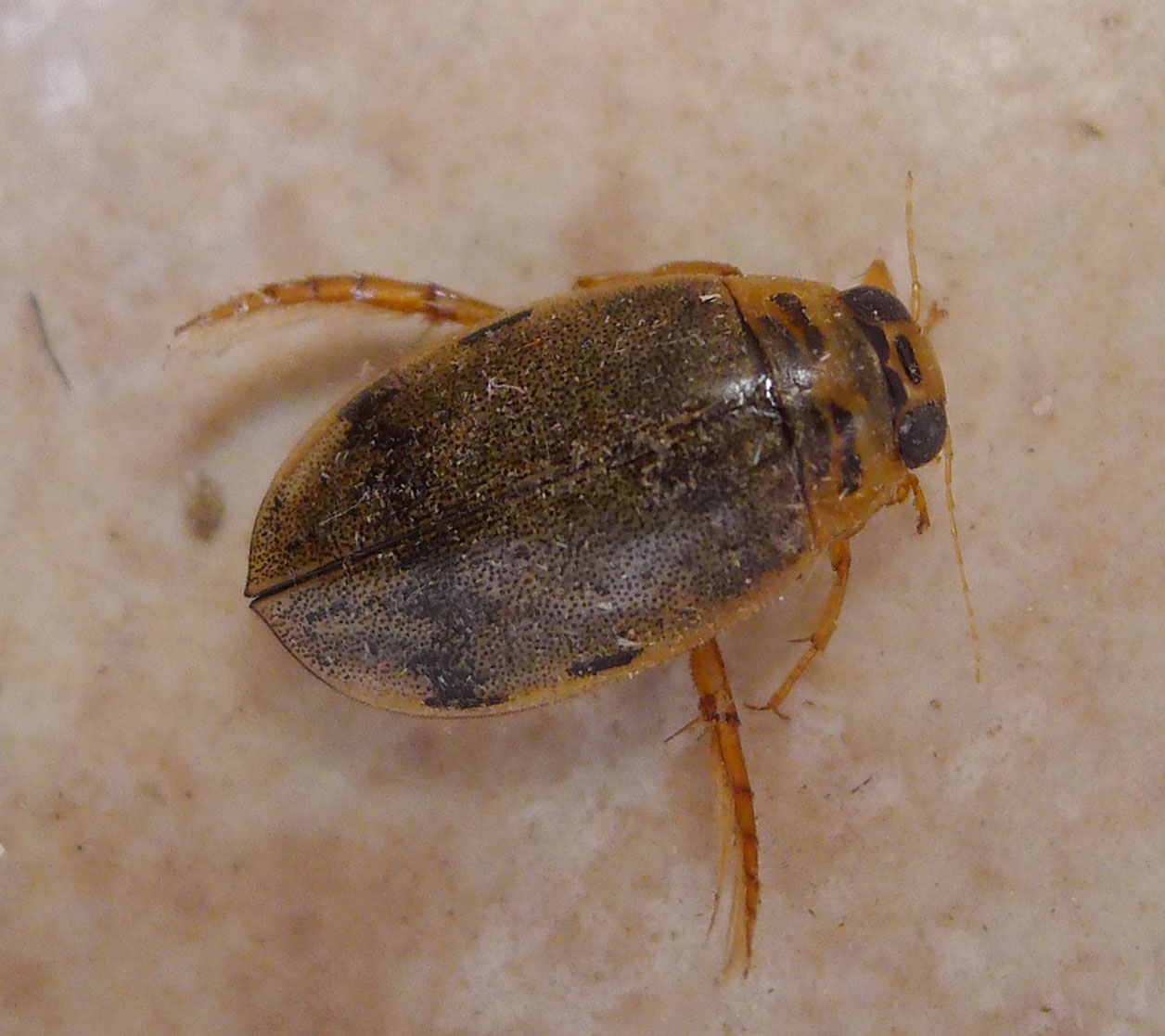
Eretes sticticus

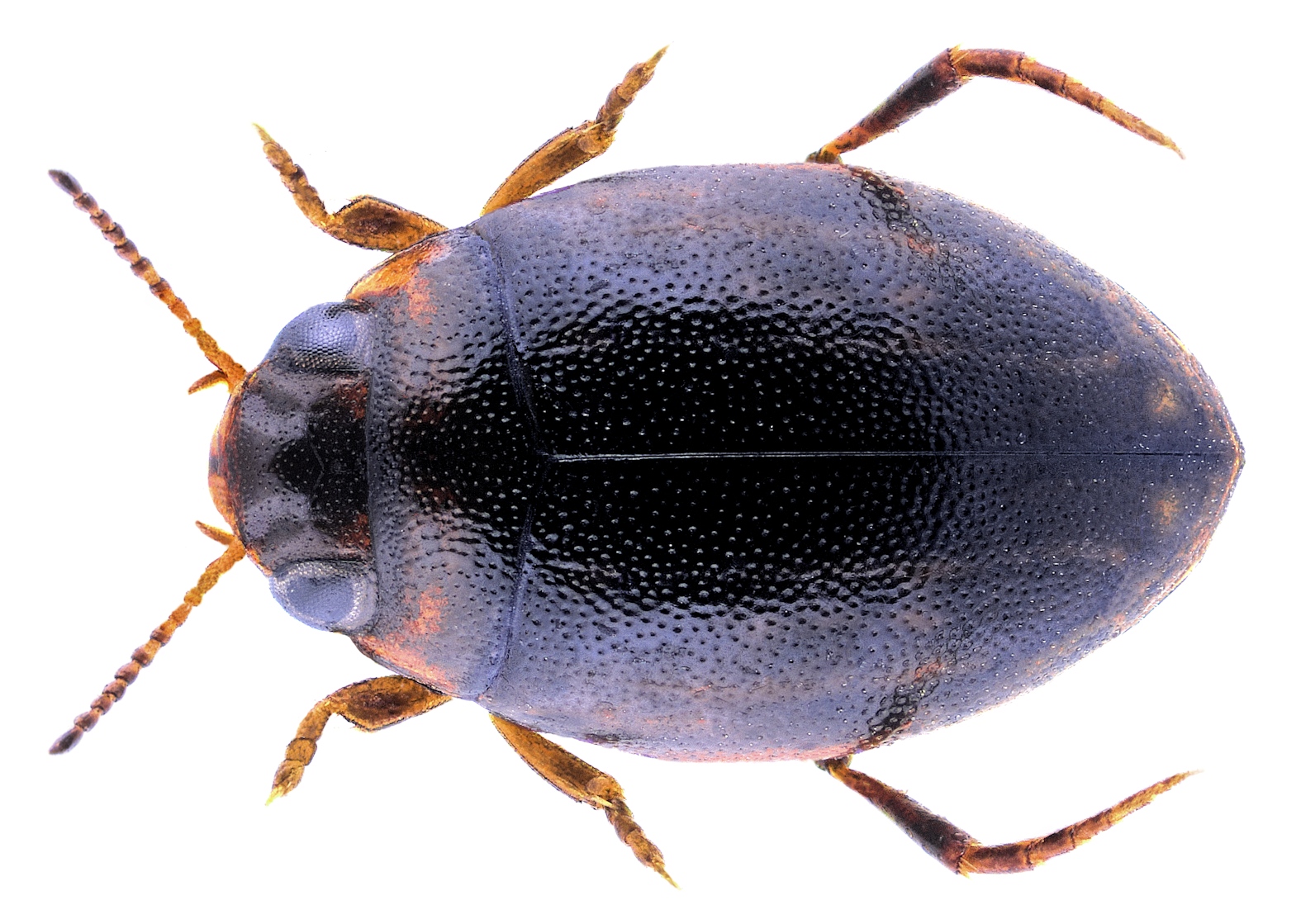
Herophydrus musicus

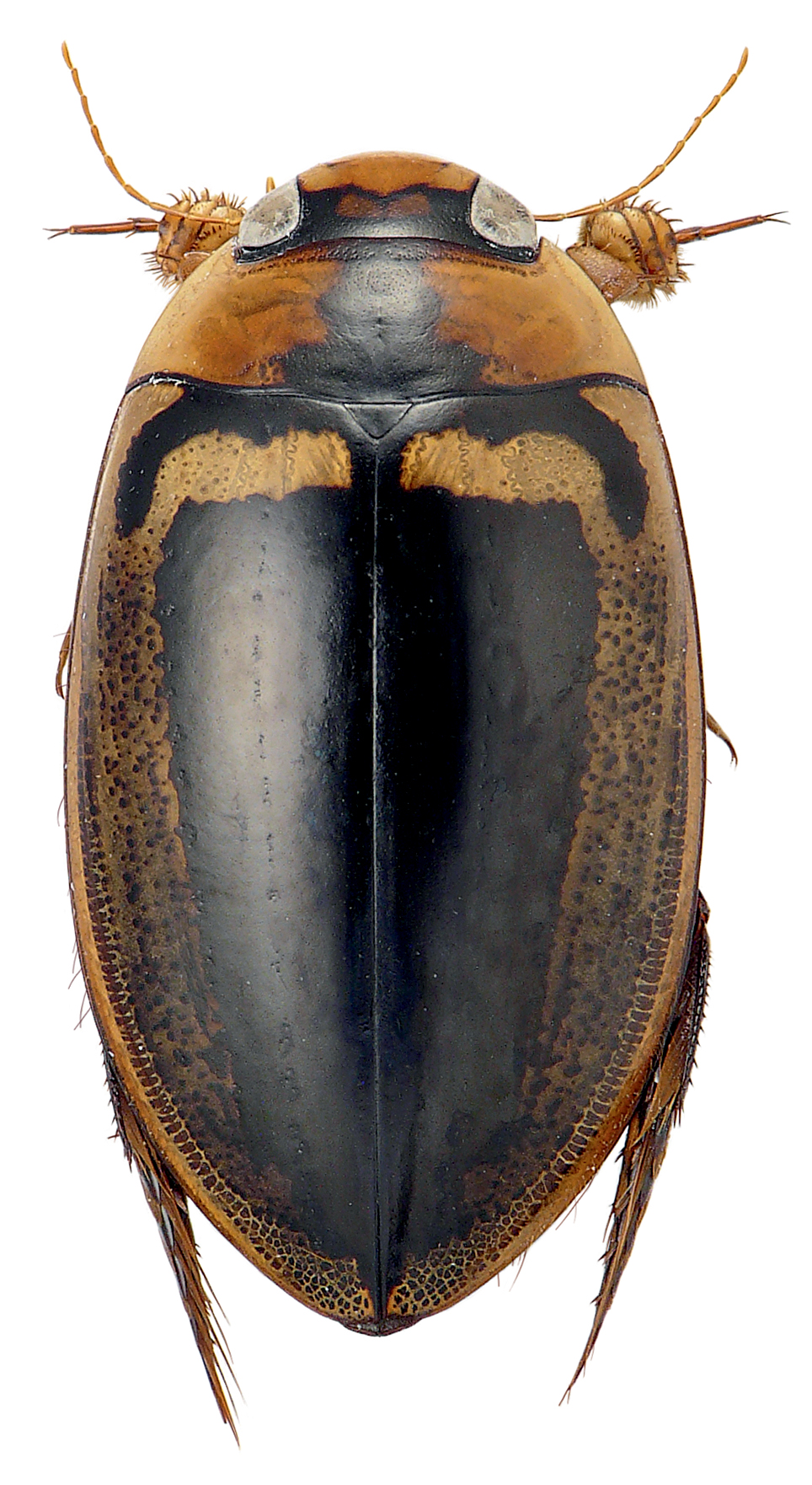
Hydaticus luczonicus

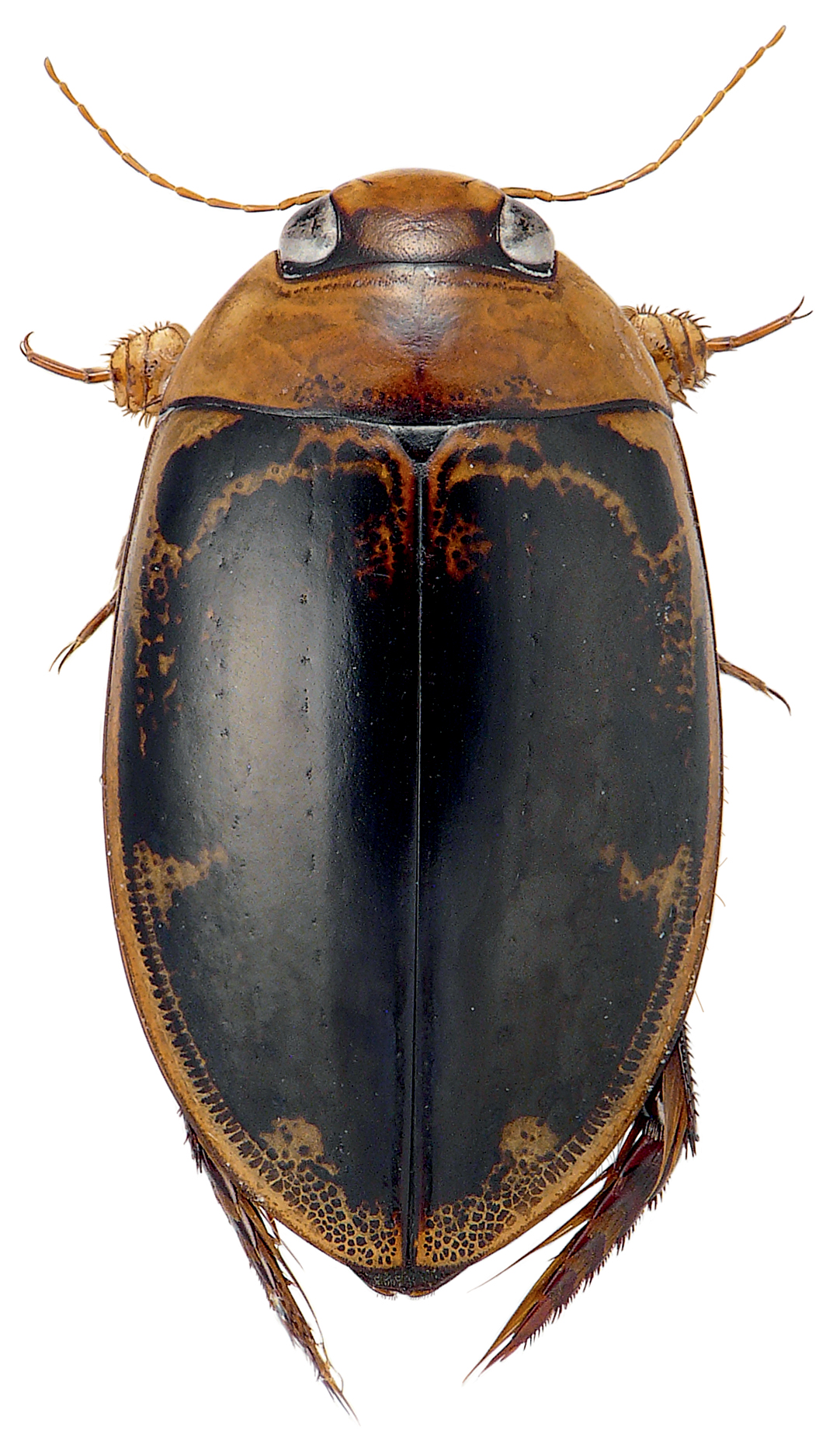
Hydaticus pacificus

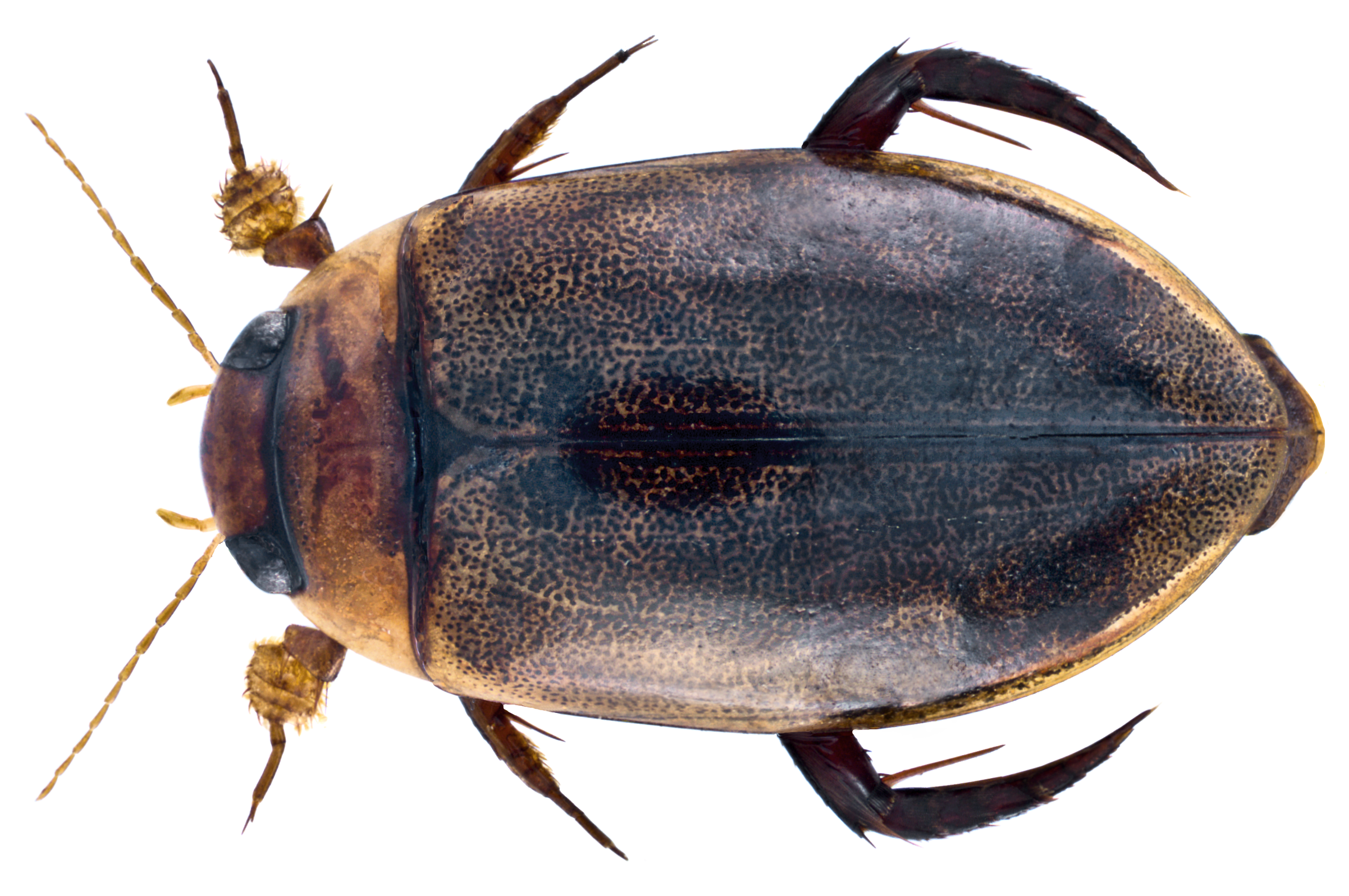
Hydaticus ricinus

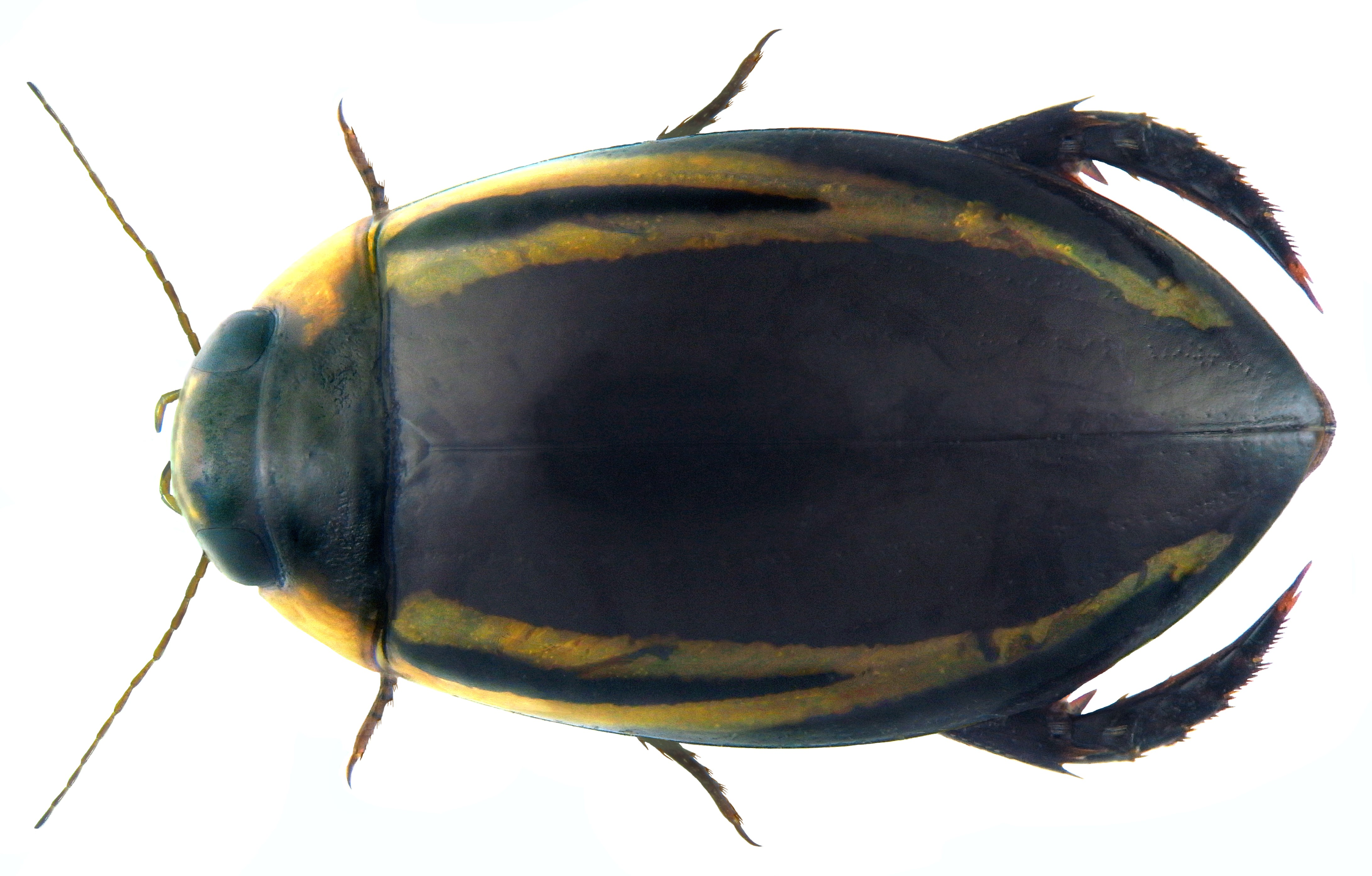
Hydaticus satoi

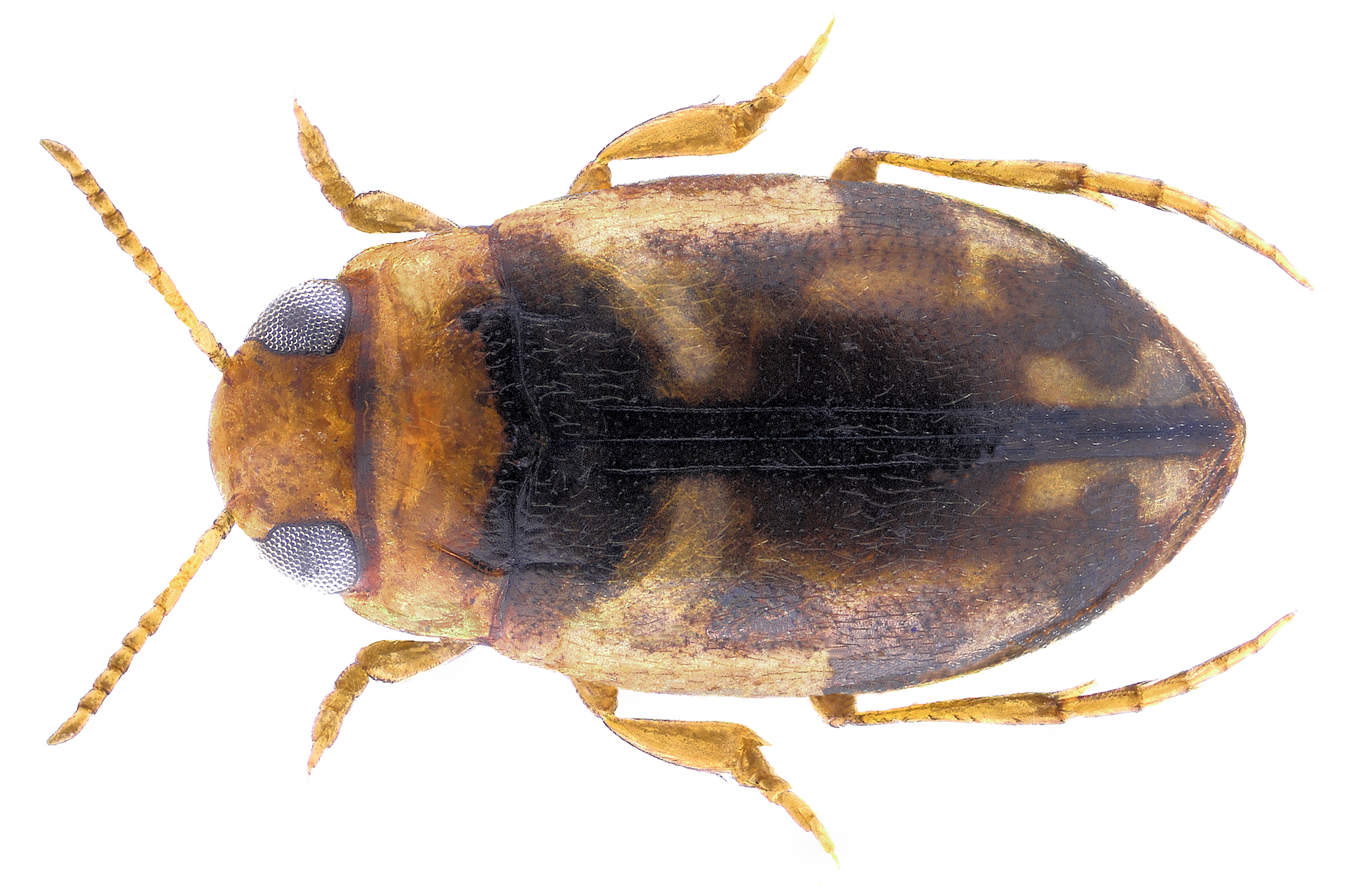
Hydroglyphus inconstans

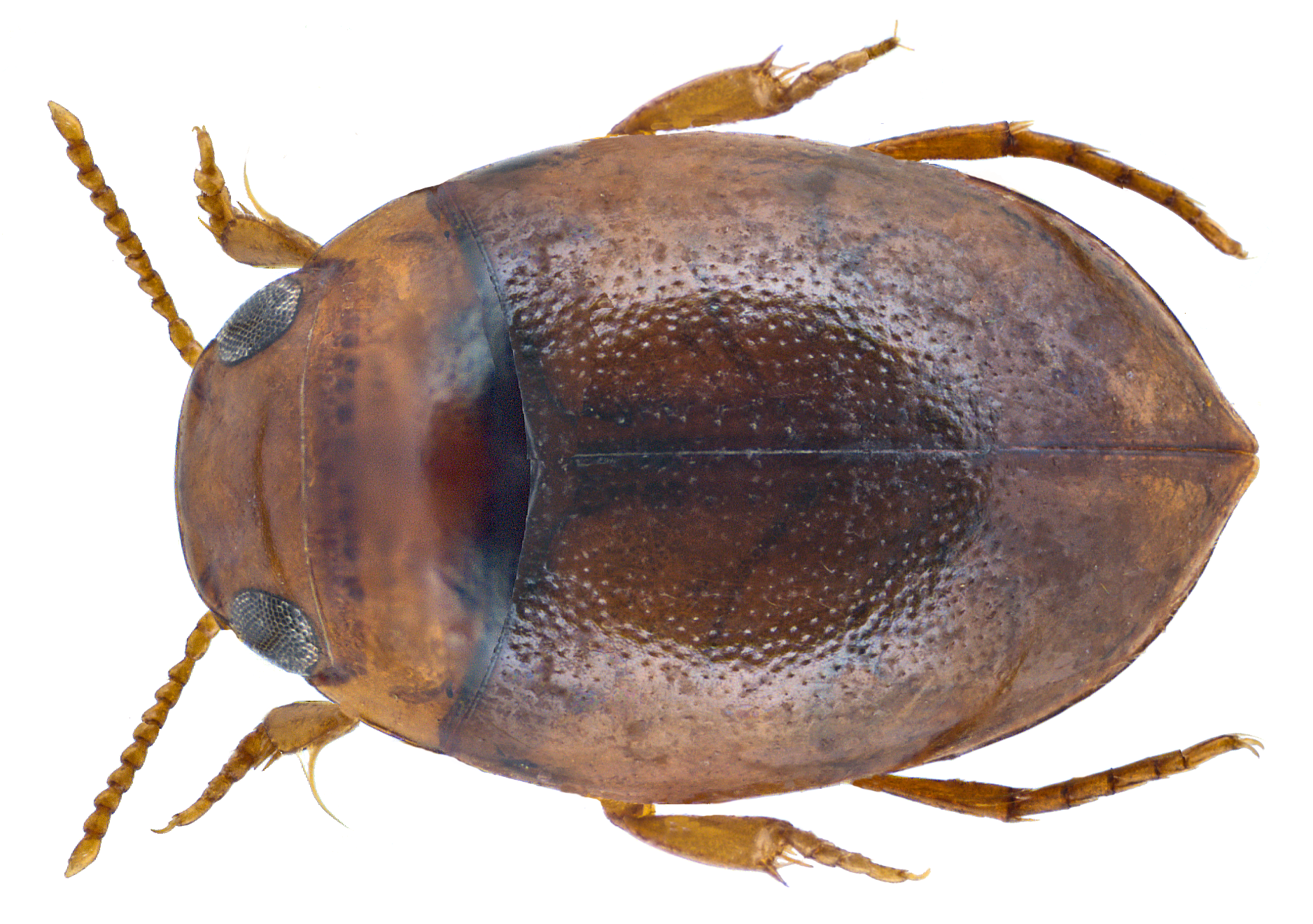
Hydrovatus seminarius

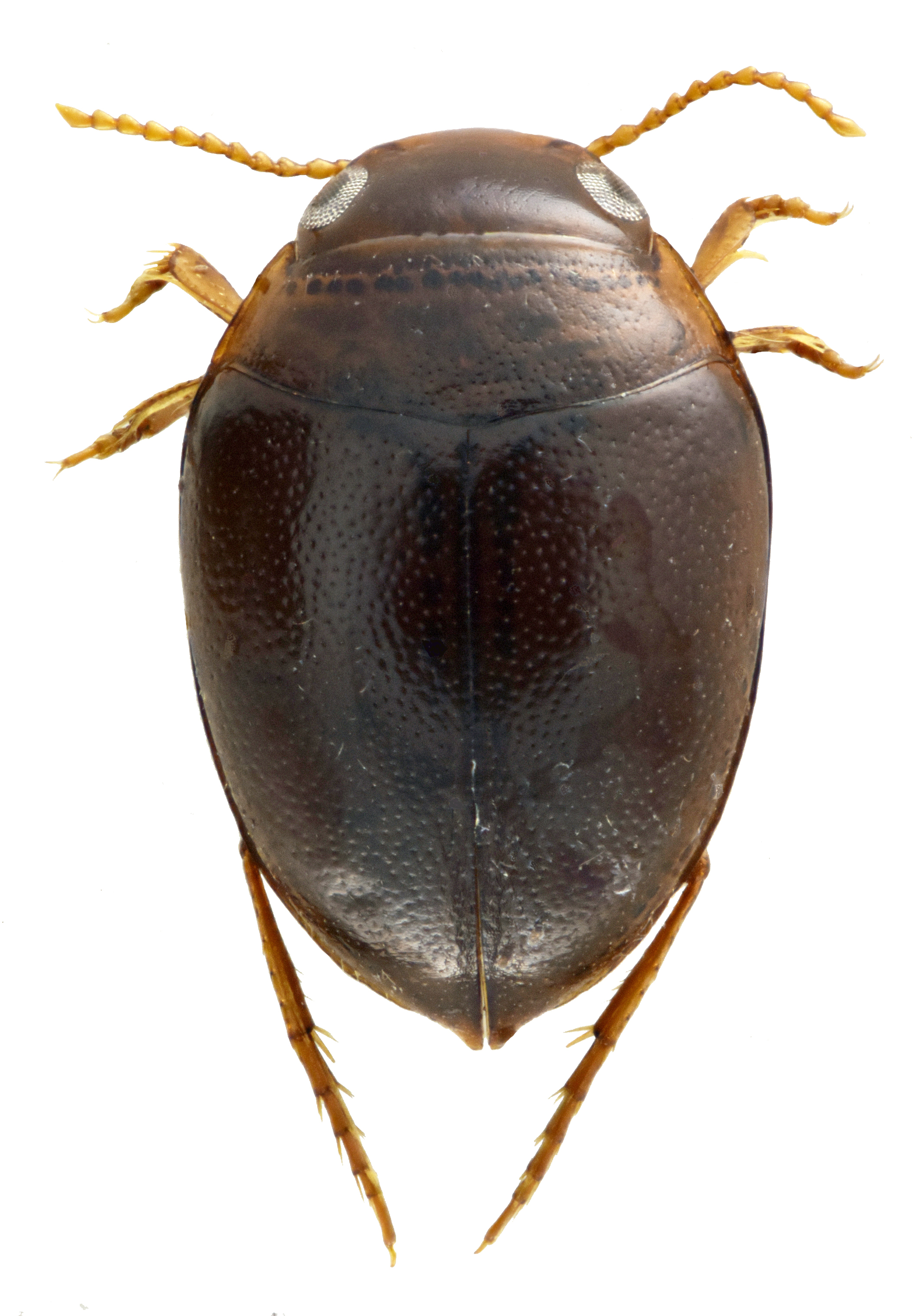
Hydrovatus sinister

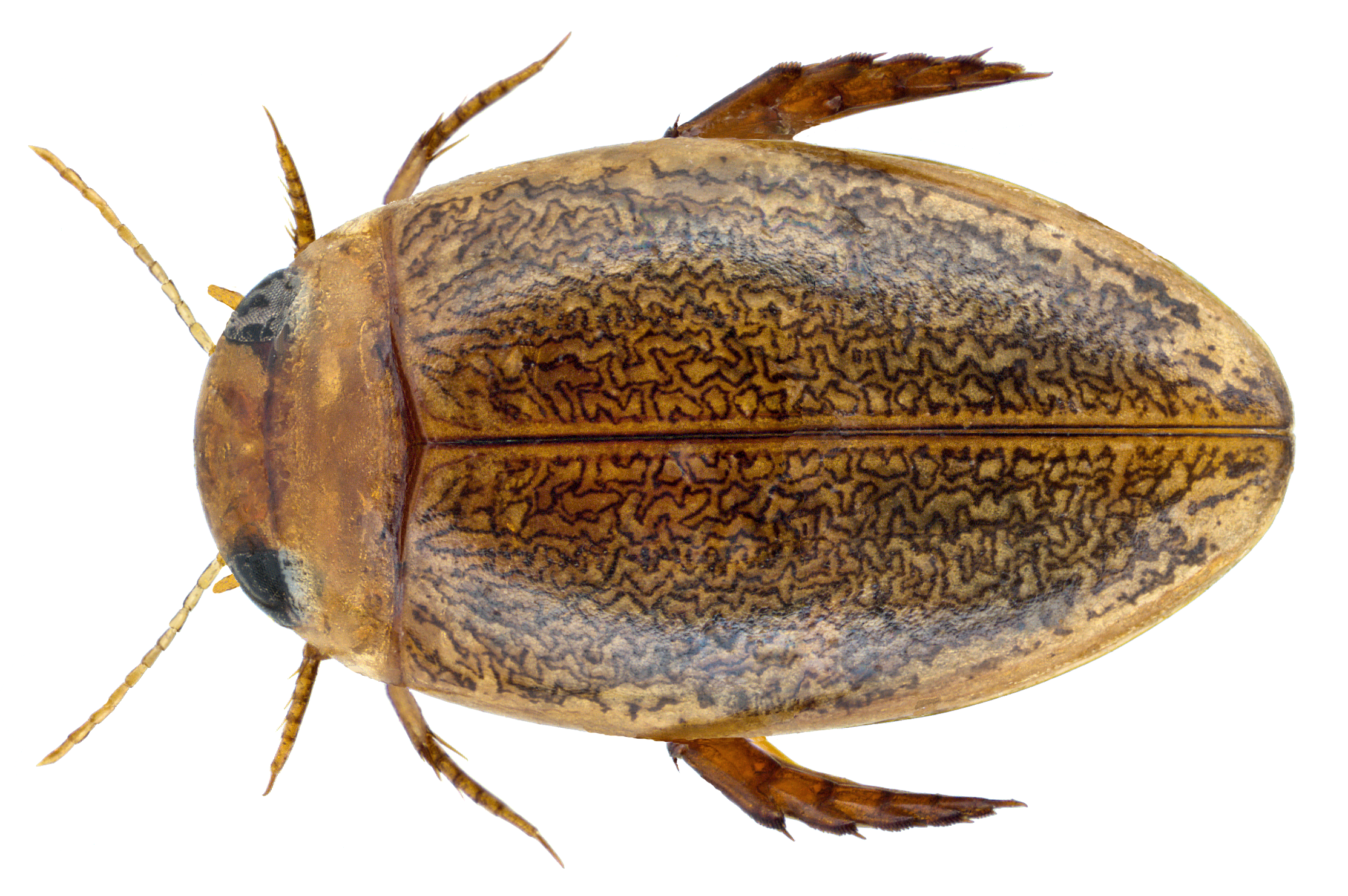
Laccophilus flexuosus

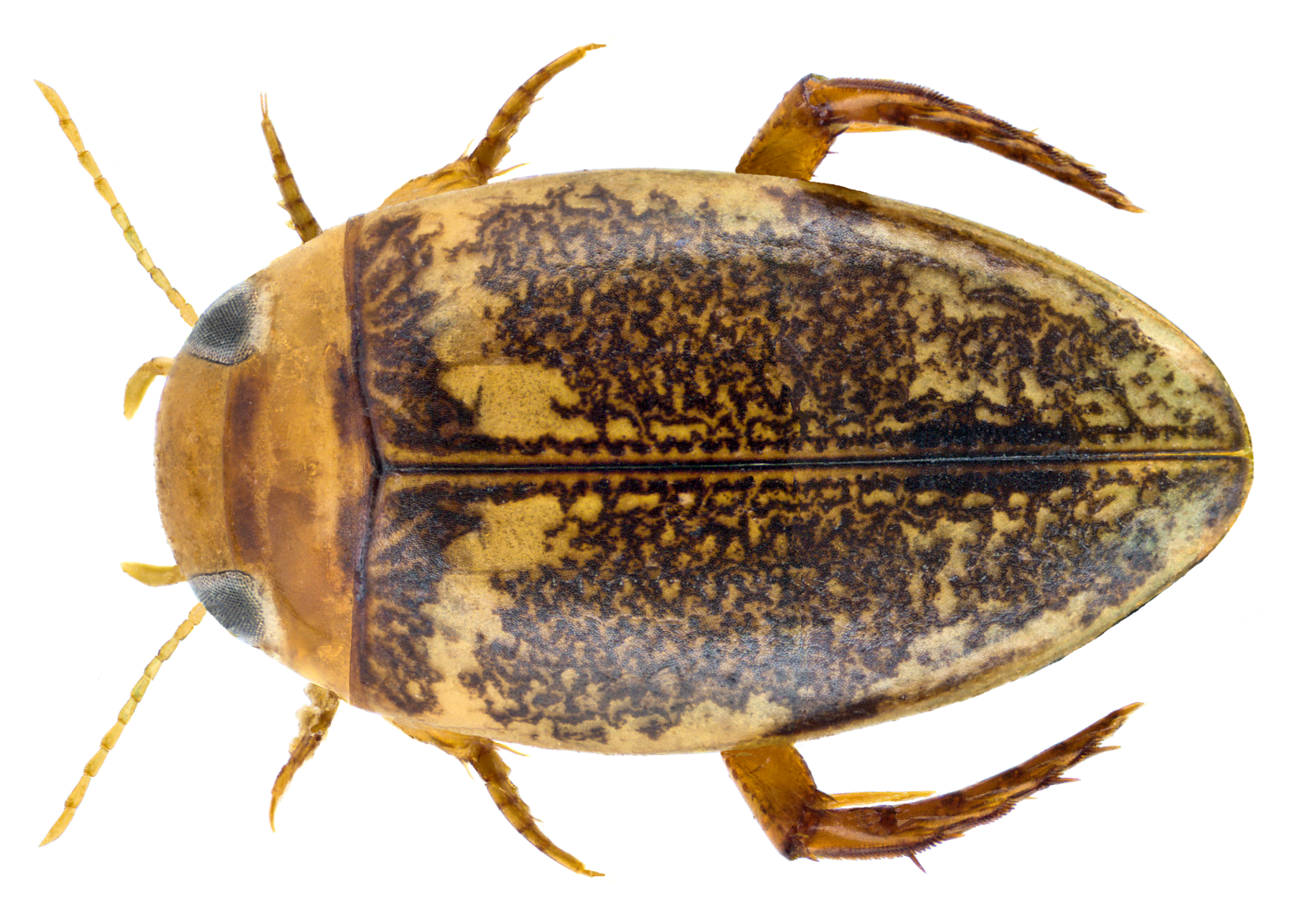
Laccophilus inefficiens

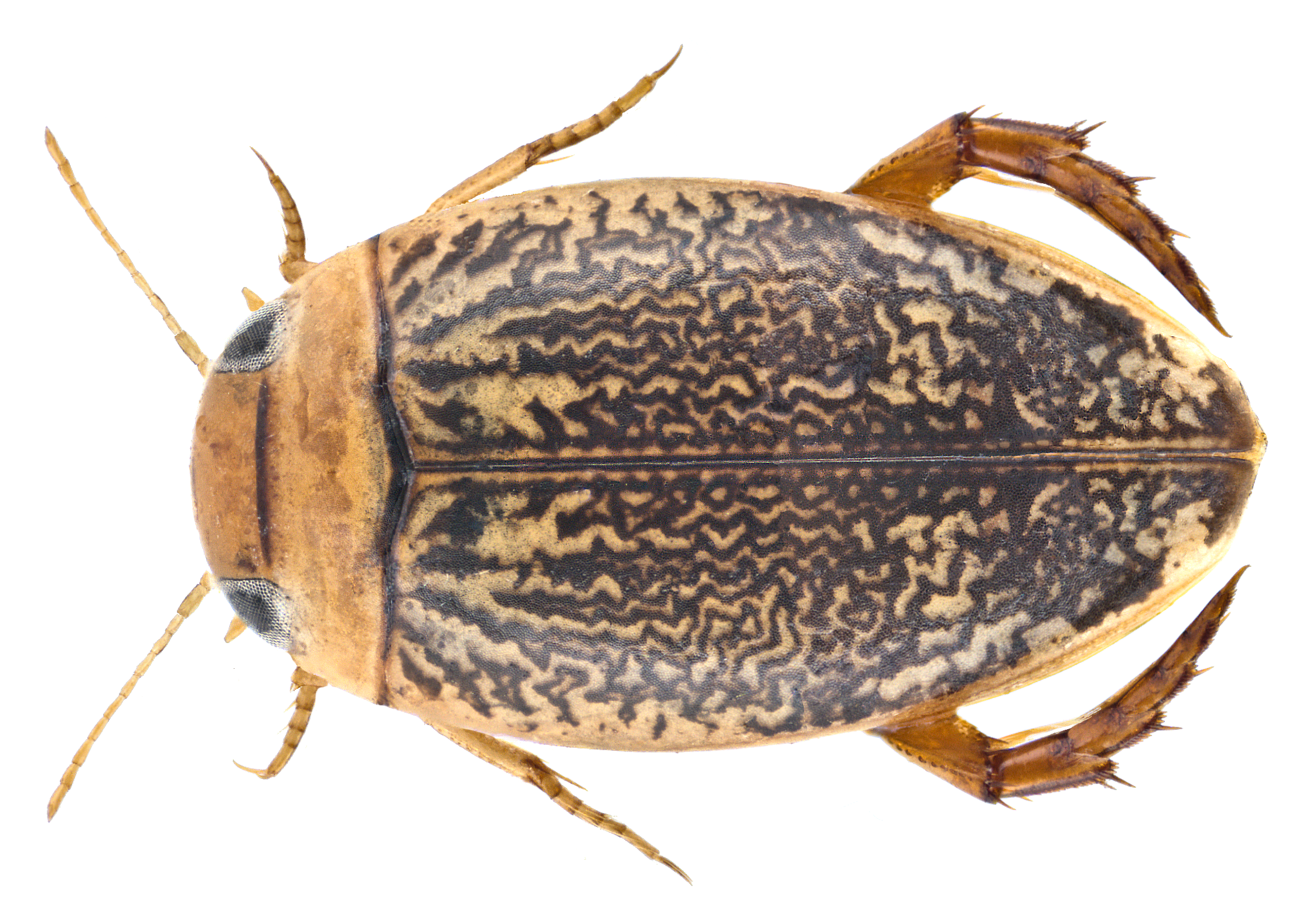
Laccophilus parvulus

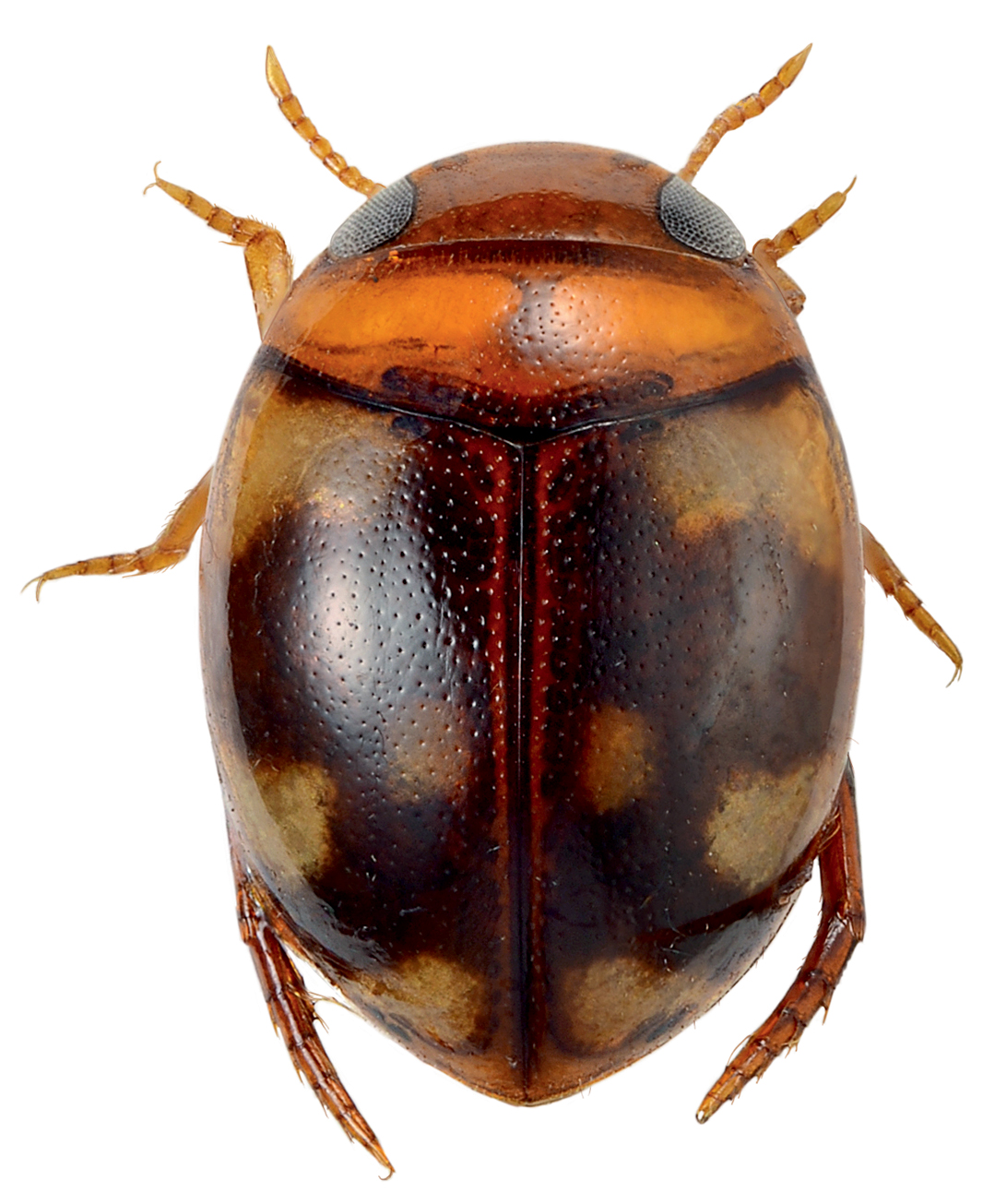
Microdytes maculatus

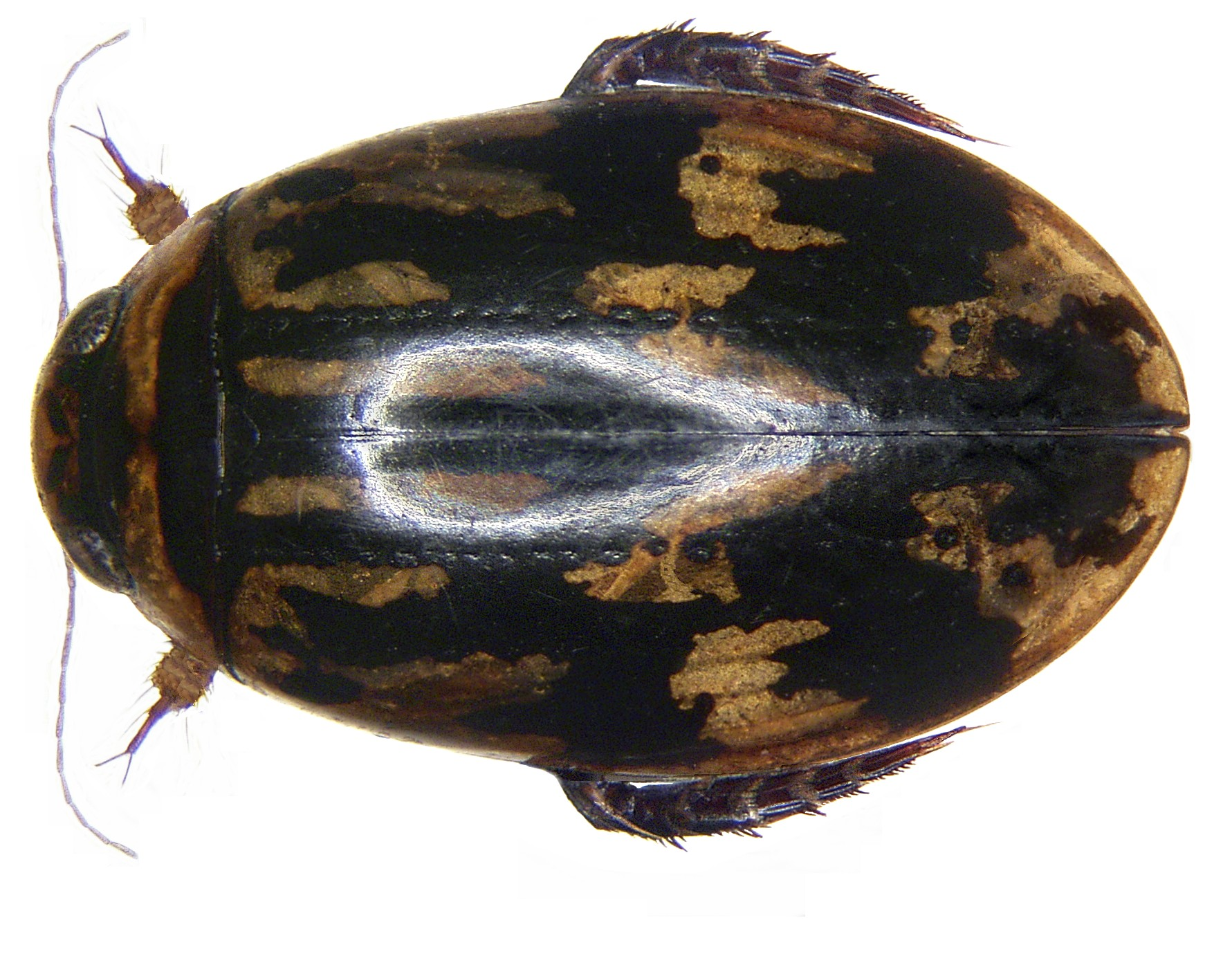
Sandracottus festivus

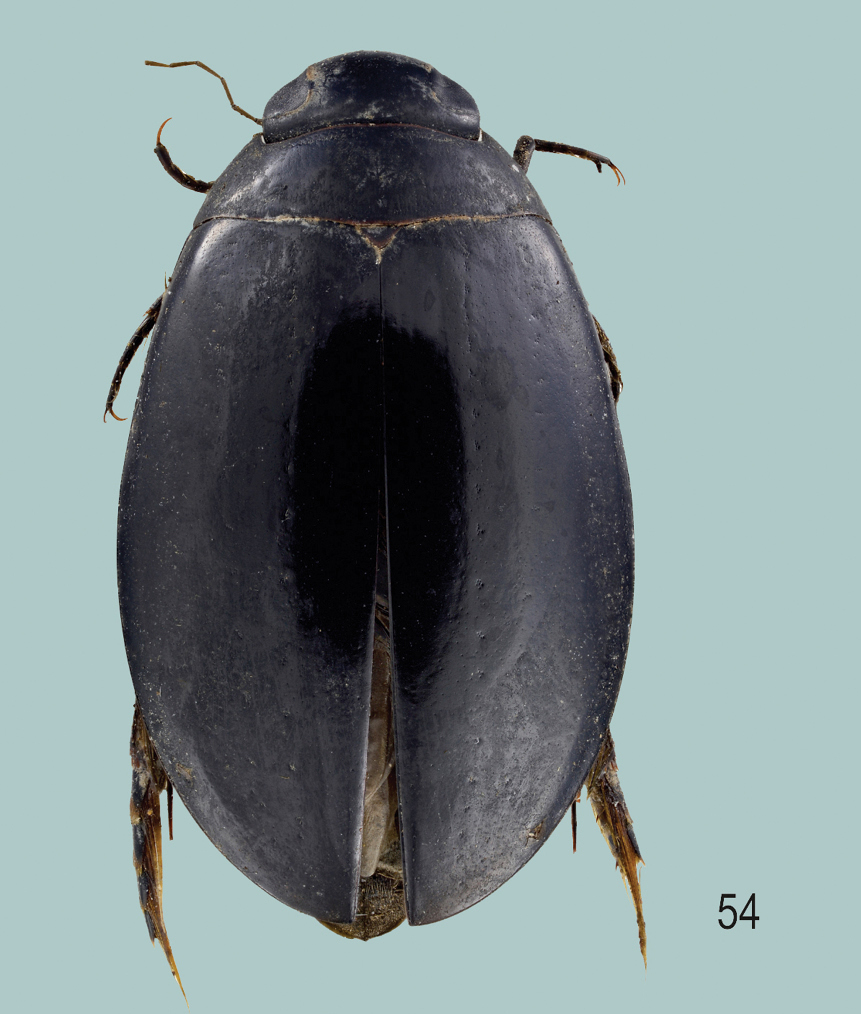
Sandracottus jaechi

=== Family: Elateridae - Click beetles ===
- Adelocera fulvicollis
- Aeoloderma brachmana
- Anchastus humeralis
- Calais speciosus
- Cardiotarsus vulneratus
- Ceropectus cederholmi
- Ceylanidrillus kandyanus
- Conoderus collaris
- Conoderus pruinosus
- Cryptalaus sordidus
- Dicronychus stolatus
- Drapetes subula
- Drasterius sulcatulus
- Elius dilatatus
- Lanelater fuscipes
- Lanelater robustus
- Lanelater sobrinus
- Lissomus mastrucatus
- Melanotus cribriventris
- Melanotus fuscus
- Melanotus punctosus
- Melanotus walkeri
- Meristhus ceylonensis
- Mulsanteus hirtellus
- Negastrius anderssoni
- Negastrius brincki
- Paracardiophorus fuscipennis
- Parallelostethus macassariensis
- Priopus vafer
- Quasimus tomentosus
- Rismethus diodesmoides
- Rismethus minusculus
- Selasia apicalis
- Selasia isabellae
- Silesis becvari
- Silesis insularis
- Xanthopenthes ceylonensis
- Zorochros misellus
- Zorochros titanus
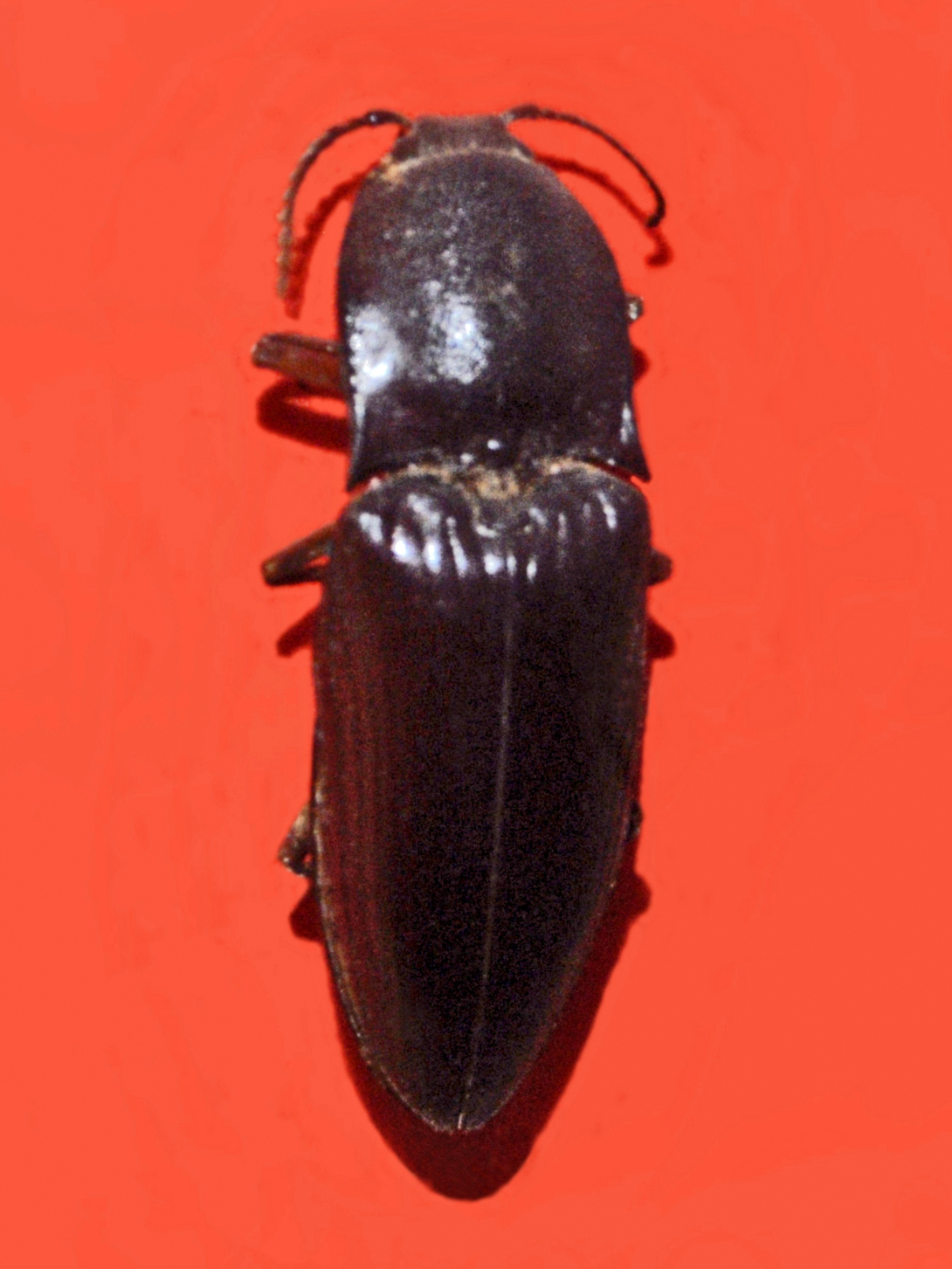
Lanelater fuscipes

=== Family: Elmidae - Riffle beetles ===
- Aesobia pygmea
- Ancyronyx jaechi
- Cephalolimnius ater
- Graphelmis ceylonica
- Ilamelmis brunnescens
- Ilamelmis crassa
- Ilamelmis foveicollis
- Ilamelmis starmuhlneri
- Ilamelmis cederholmi
- Ohiya carinata
- Ordobrevia flavolineata
- Ordobrevia fletcheri
- Podelmis aenea
- Podelmis ater
- Podelmis cruzei
- Podelmis graphica
- Podelmis humeralis
- Podelmis metallica
- Podelmis ovalis
- Podelmis quadriplagiata
- Podelmis similis
- Podelmis viridiaenea
- Potamophilinus costatus
- Potamophilinus impressicollis
- Potamophilinus torrenticola
- Stenelmis anderssoni
- Stenelmis brincki
- Taprobanelmis carinata
- Unguisaeta rubrica
- Zaitzeviaria bicolor
- Zaitzeviaria elongata
- Zaitzeviaria zeylanica

=== Family: Endomychidae - Handsome fungus beetles ===
- Ancylopus ceylonicus
- Bystodes angustus
- Bystodes felix
- Bystodes lugubris
- Chondria minima
- Cyclotoma cingalensis
- Endocoelus laticollis
- Endocoelus minor
- Endocoelus orbicularis
- Eumorphus quadriguttatus - ssp. quadriguttatus, pulchripes
- Idiophyes ceylonica
- Idiophyes eumetopus
- Indalmus lachrymosus
- Loeblia ceylanica
- Loeblia nigra
- Mycetina castanea
- Ohtaius annularis
- Ohtaius lunulatus
- Saula ferruginea
- Saula nigripes
- Stenotarsus castaneus
- Stenotarsus nietneri
- Stenotarsus russatus
- Stenotarsus sicarius
- Stenotarsus tomentosus
- Stenotarsus vallatus
- Stictomela chrysomeloides
- Stictomela inflate
- Stictomela opulenta
- Trochoideus desjardinsi
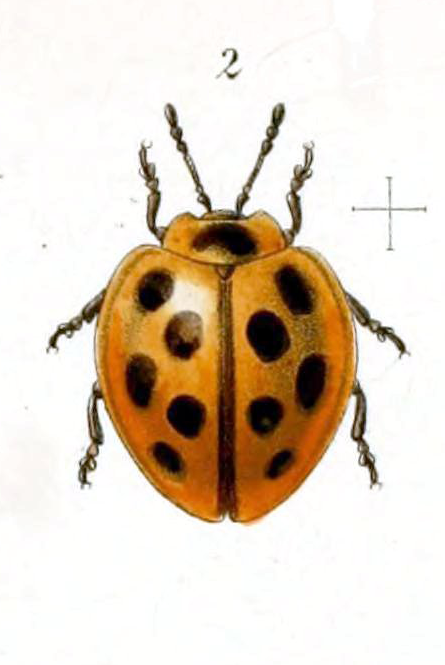
Cyclotoma cingalensis

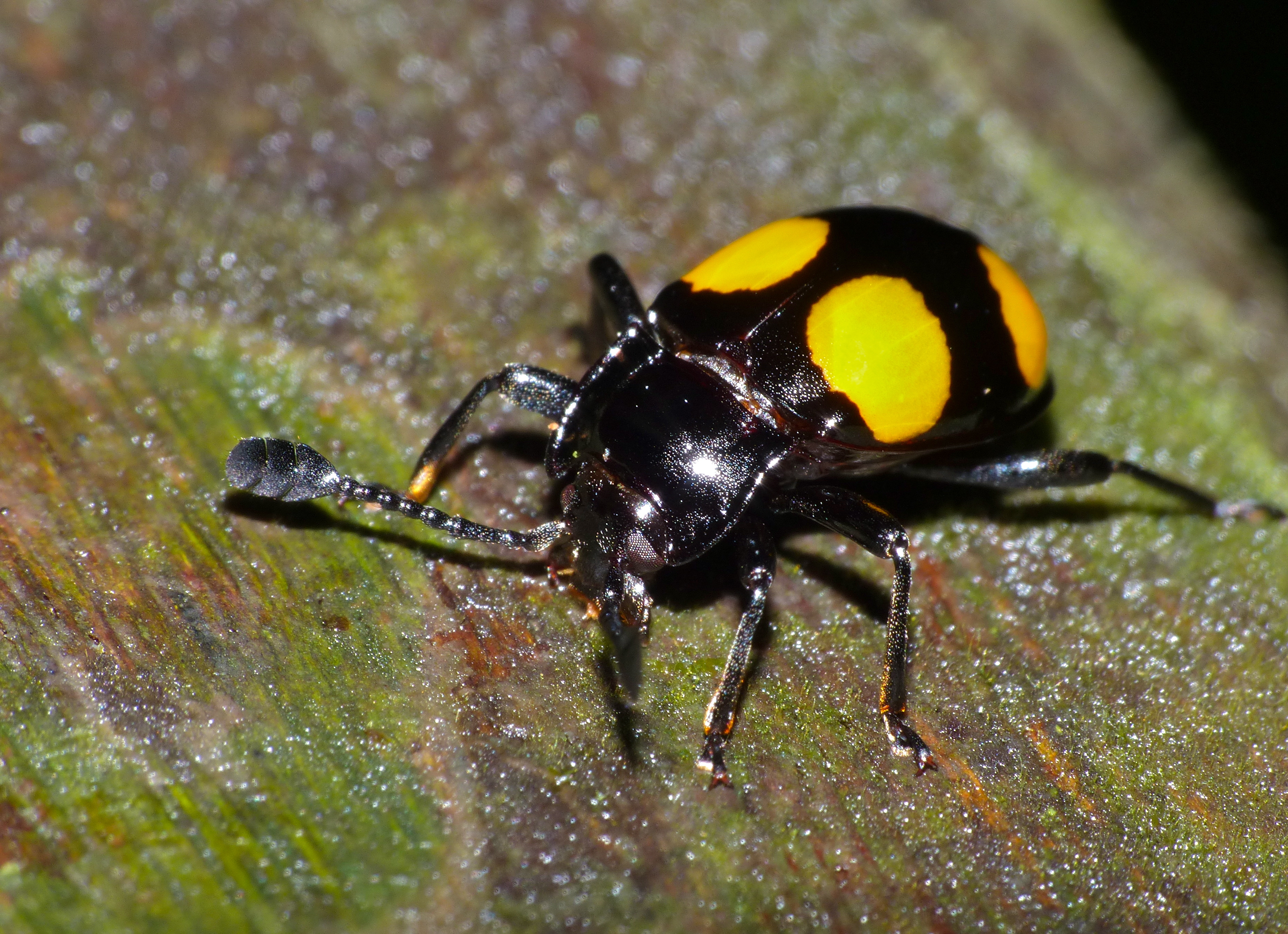
Bolbochromus

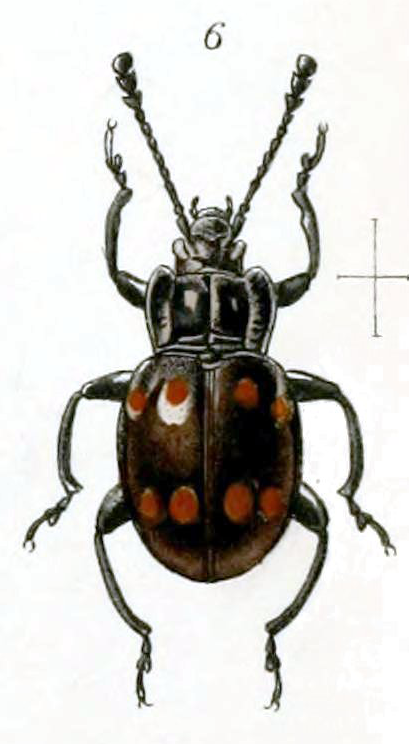
Stictomela chrysomeloides

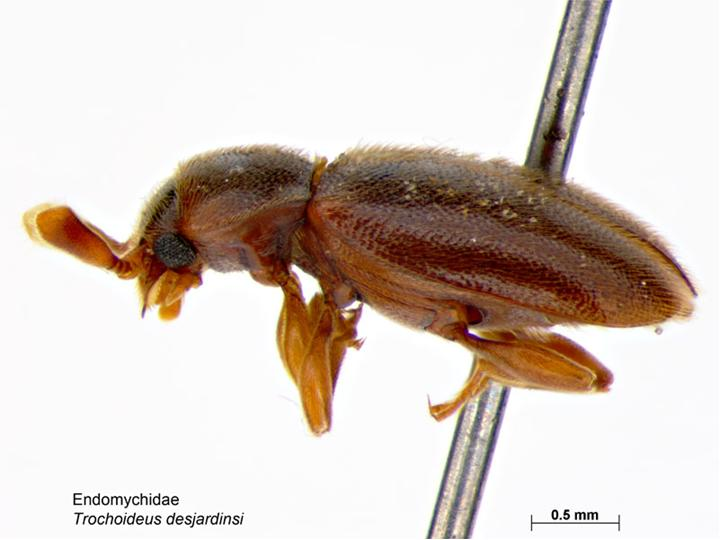
Trochoideus desjardinsi

=== Family: Erotylidae - Pleasing fungus beetles ===
- Microlanguria jansoni

=== Family: Eucinetidae - Plate-thigh beetles ===
- Eucinetus tamil

=== Family: Gyrinidae - Whirligig beetles ===
- Aulonogyrus obliquus
- Gyrinus convexiusculus
- Gyrinus sericeolimbatus
- Orectochilus dilatatus
- Orectochilus discifer
- Orectochilus fraternus
- Orectochilus indicus
- Orectochilus wehnckei
- Porrorhynchus indicans
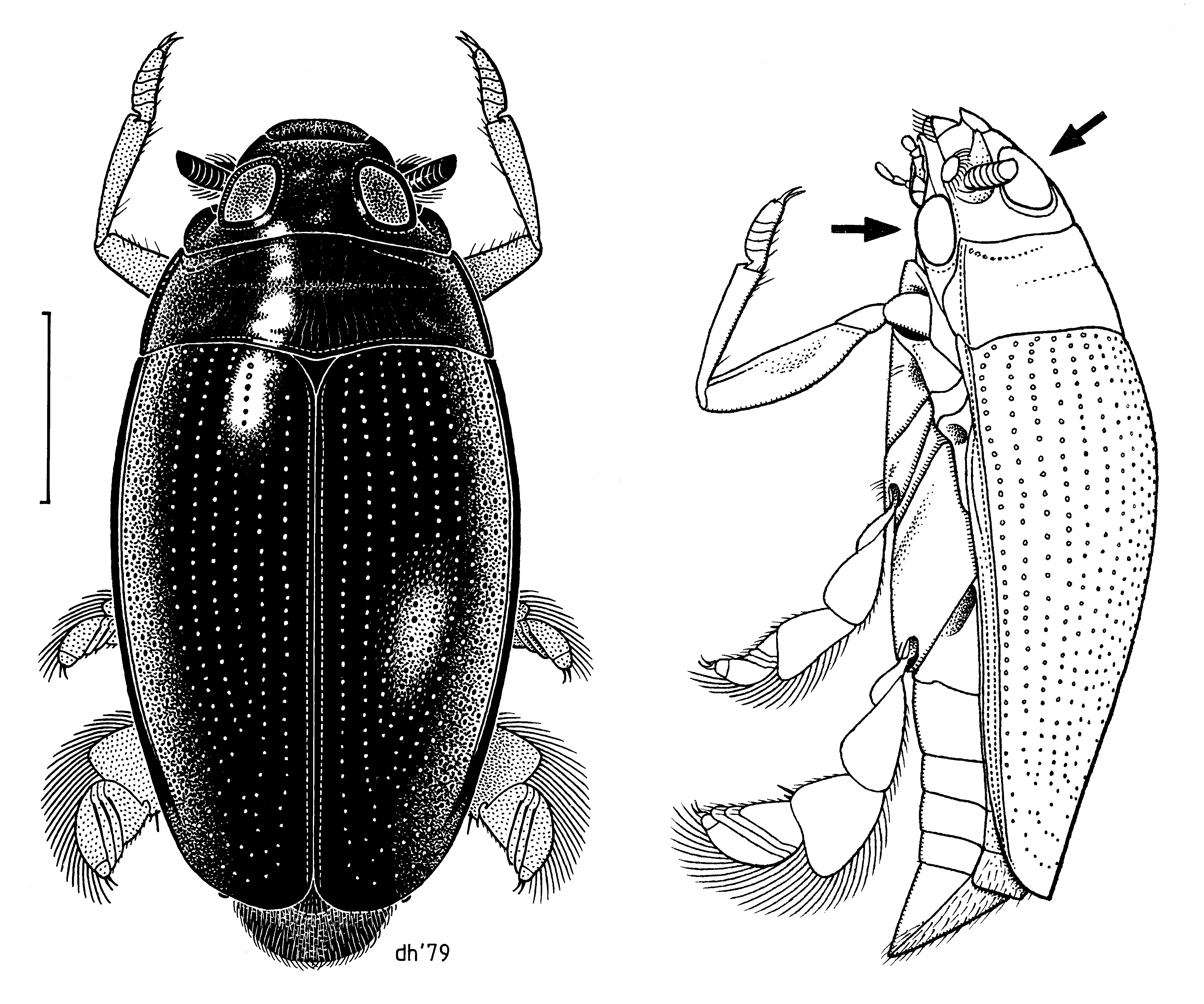
Gyrinius convexiusculus

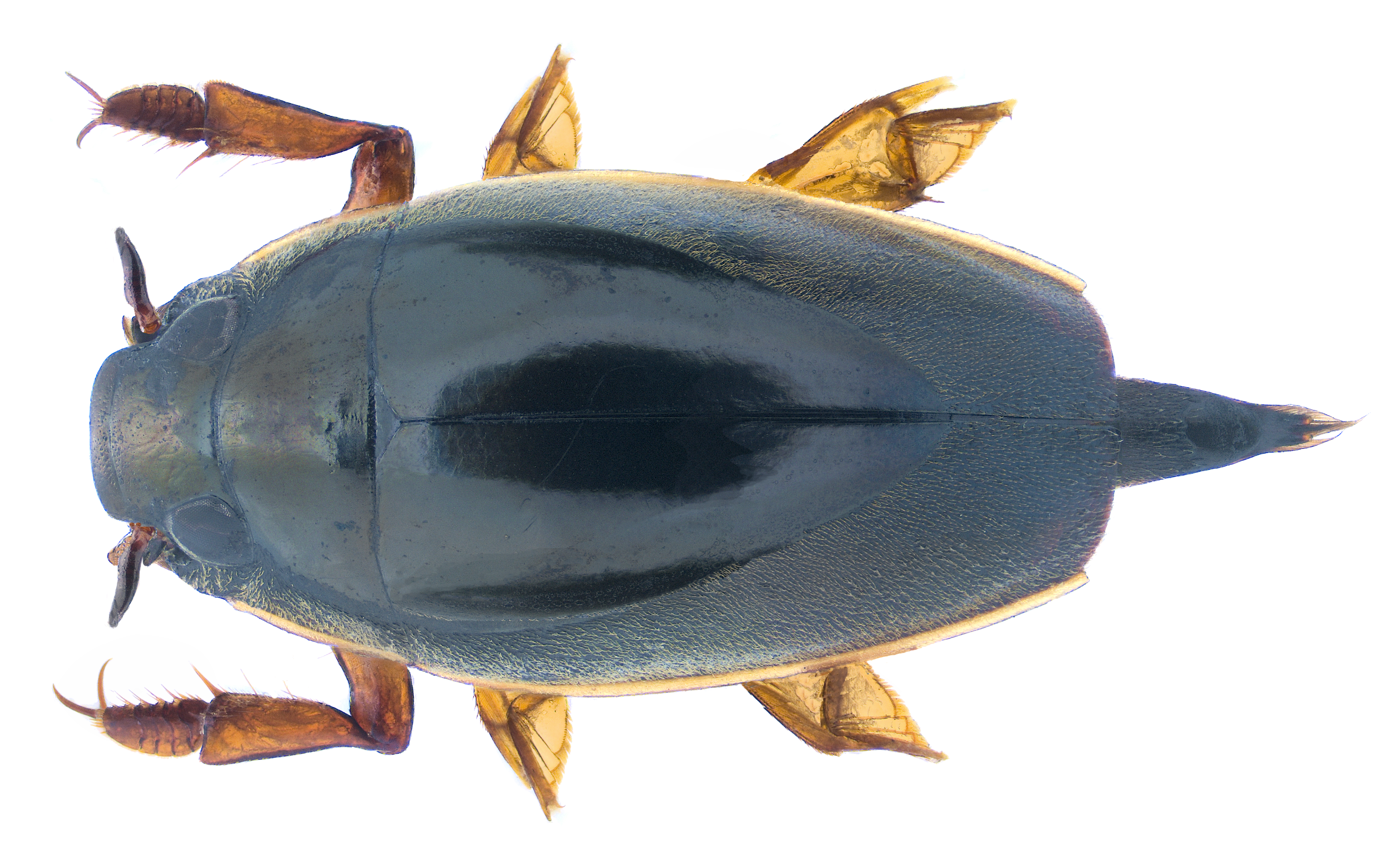
Orectochilus discifer

=== Family: Heteroceridae - Variegated mud-loving beetles ===
- Augyles feai
- Augyles ivojenisi
- Augyles sublinearis
- Heterocerus cinctus
- Heterocerus maindroni

=== Family: Histeridae - Clown beetles ===
- Acritus copricola
- Acritus tuberisternus
- Atholus coelestis
- Atholus daldorffi
- Bacanius ambiguus
- Chaetabraeus granosus
- Chaetabraeus orientalis
- Chaetabraeus paria
- Chalcionellus pulchellus
- Cypturus aenescens
- Epiechinus taprobanae
- Halacritus alutiger
- Hister javanicus
- Hister trigonifrons
- Hololepta elongata
- Liopygus minutus
- Liopygus subsuturalis
- Nasaltus chinensis
- Nasaltus orientalis
- Pachylister lutarius
- Pachylister scaevola
- Platylister desinens
- Platylomalus biarculus
- Platylomalus oceanitis
- Tribalus colombius
- Trypeticus bombacis
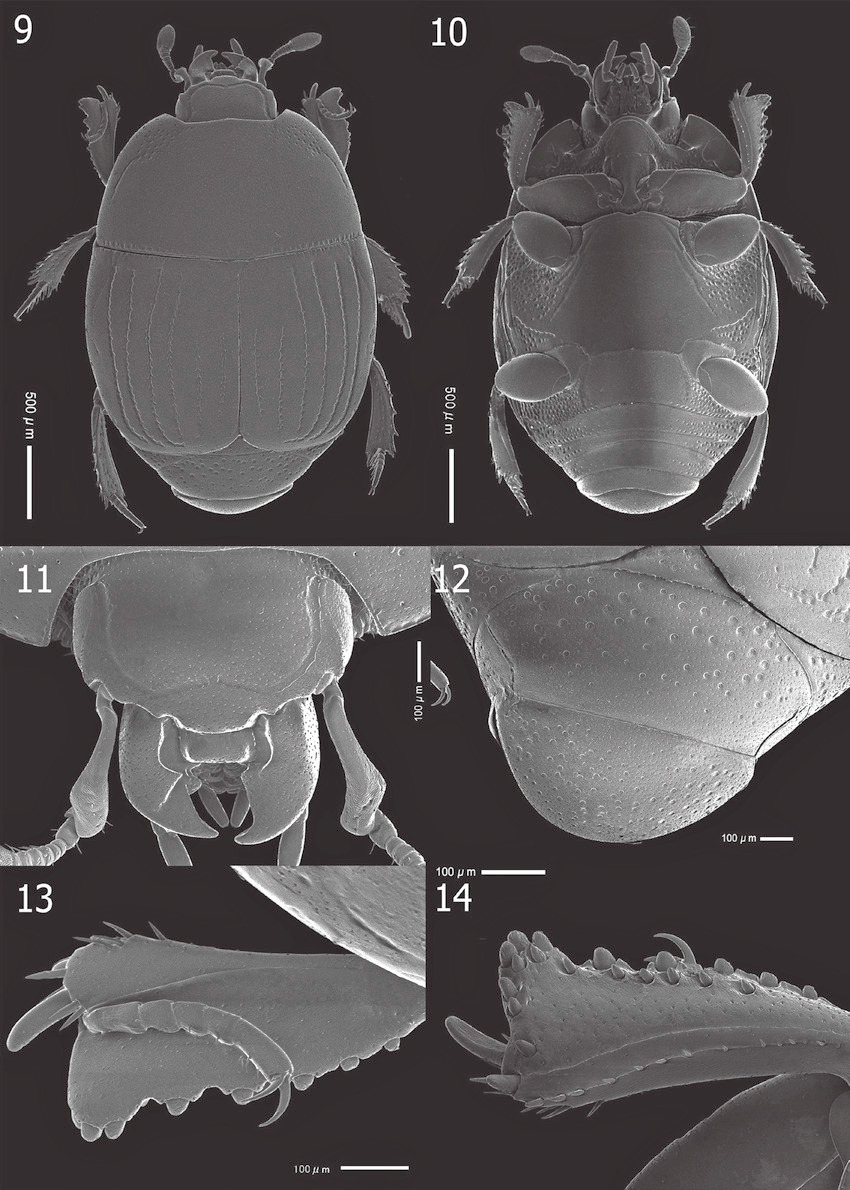
Atholus coelestis

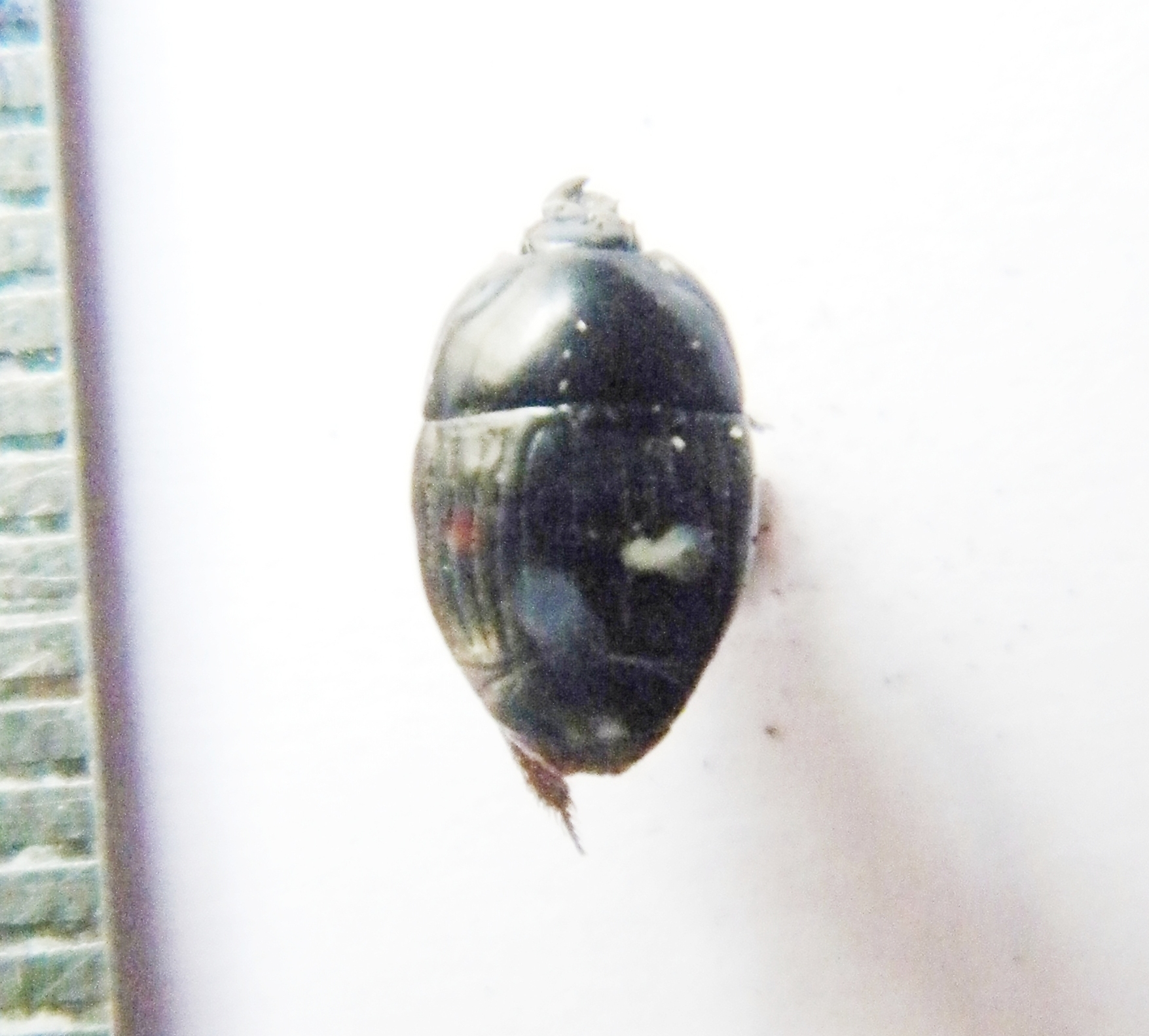
Hister javanicus

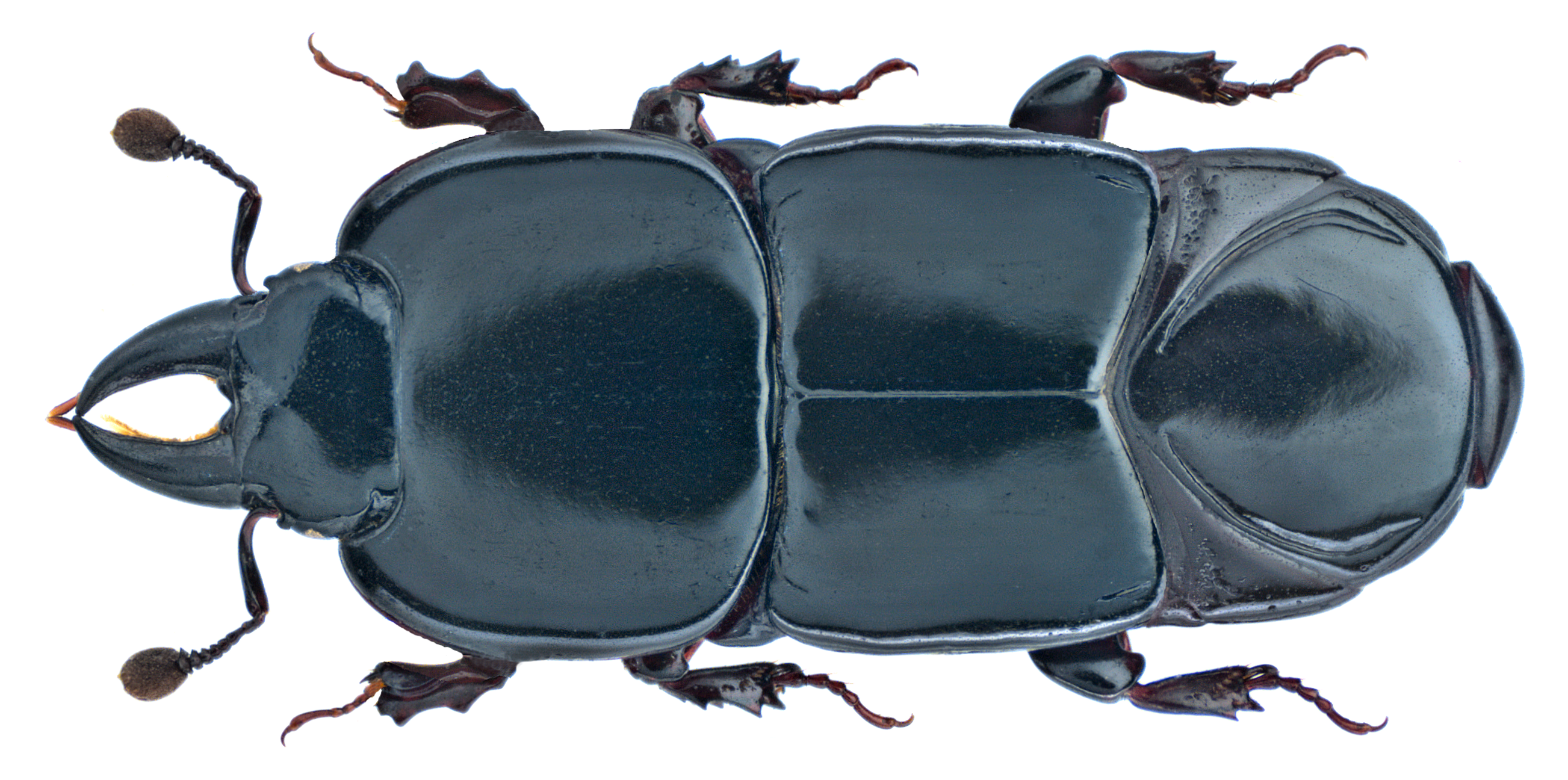
Hololepta elongata

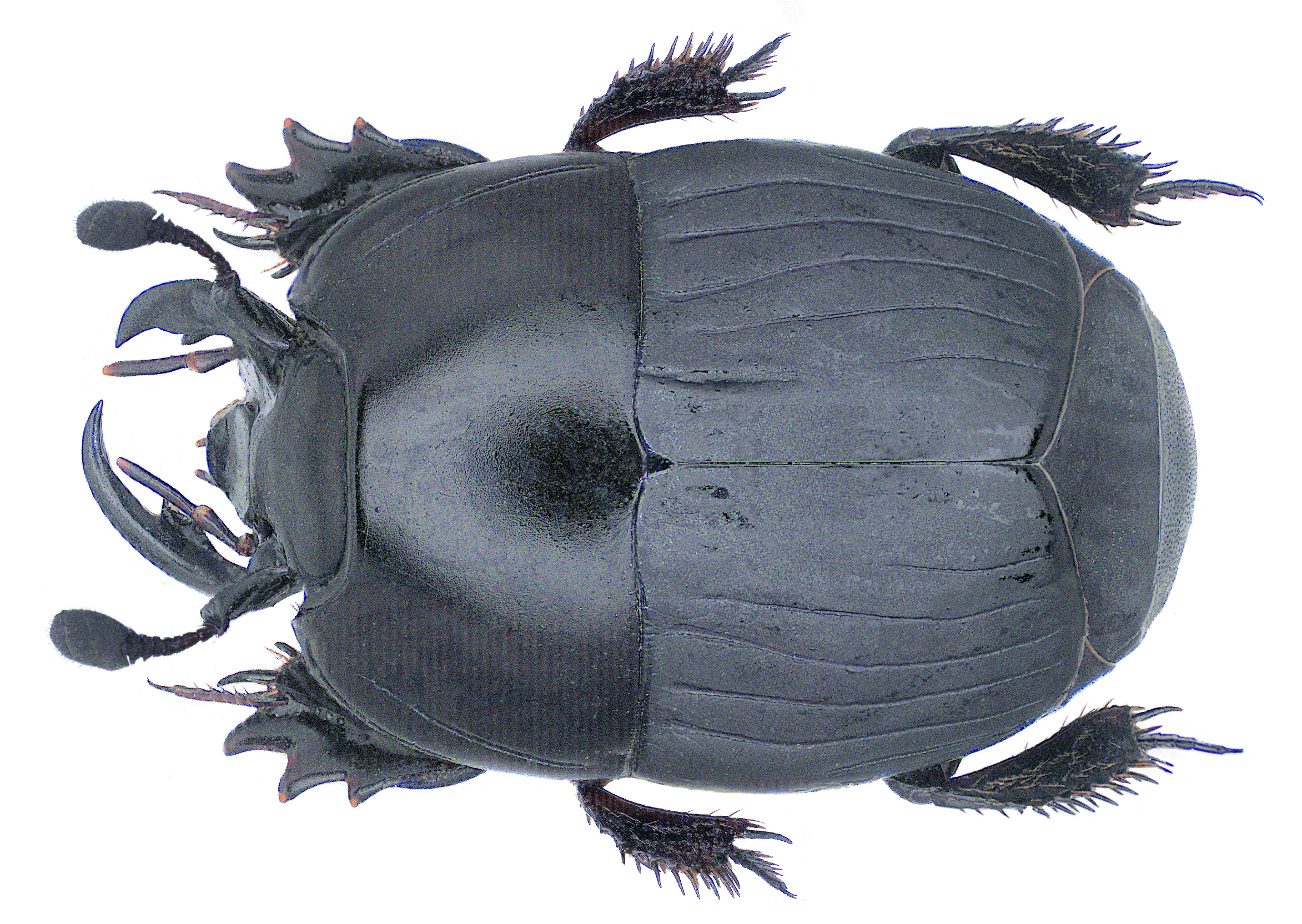
Nasaltus chinensis

=== Family: Hybosoridae - Scavenger scarab beetles ===
- Besuchetostes besucheti
- Besuchetostes loebli
- Besuchetostes mussardi
- Besuchetostes peradeniyae
- Besuchetostes taprobanae
- Hybosorus orientalis
- Phaeochrous compactus
- Phaeochrous elevatus
- Phaeochrous emarginatus
- Pterorthochaetes haroldi
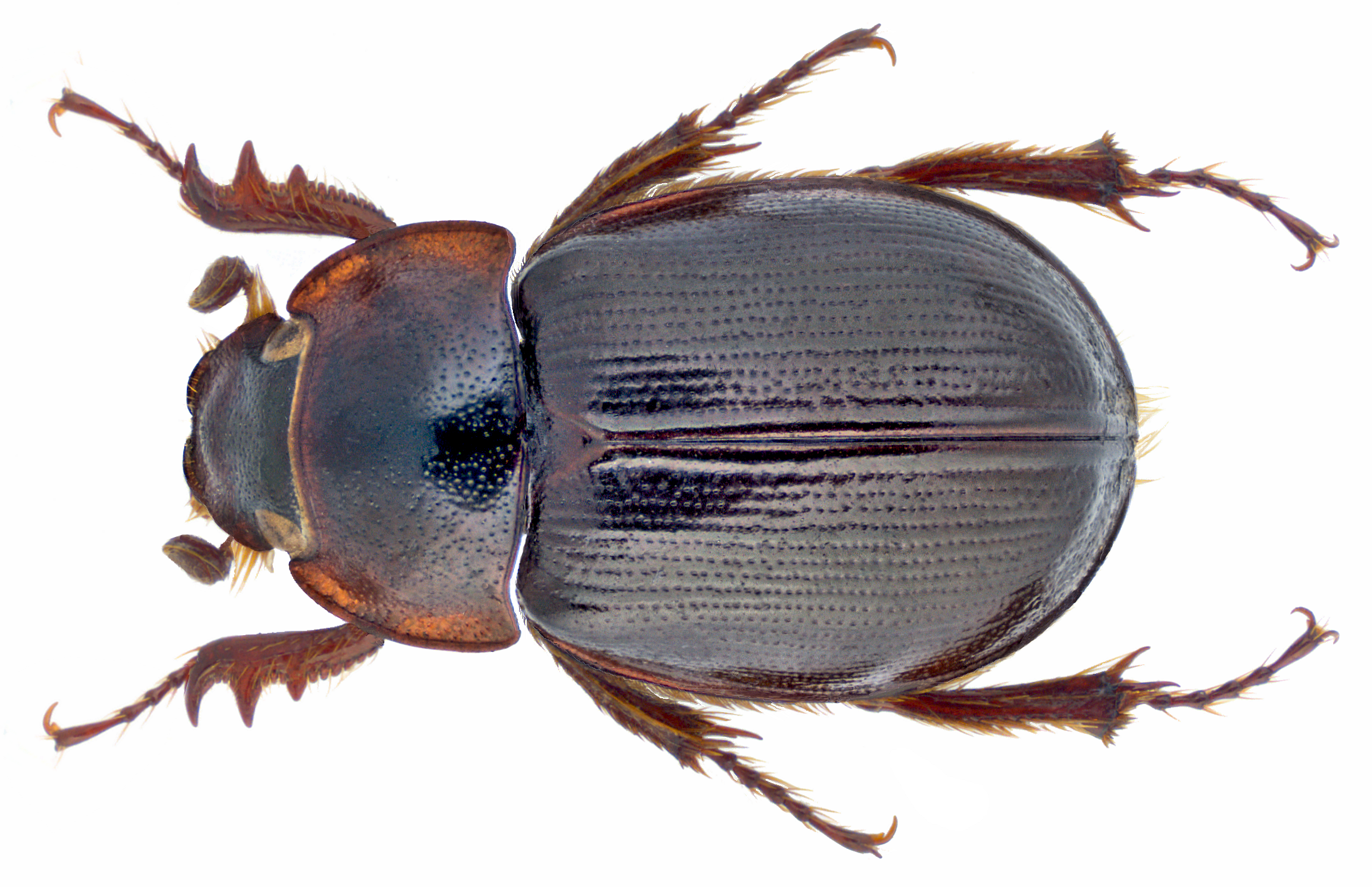
Phaeochrous emarginatus

=== Family: Hydrophilidae - Water scavenger beetles ===
- Berosus pulchellus
- Berosus undatus
- Cercyon connivens
- Cercyon lineolatus
- Cercyon nigriceps
- Cercyon subsolanus
- Chasmogenus abnormalis
- Coelostoma stultum
- Coelostoma vitalisi
- Dactylosternum abdominale
- Enochrus esuriens
- Helochares mundus
- Hydrophilus bilineatus - ssp. caschmirensis
- Paroosternum sorex
- Pelthydrus jengi
- Pelthydrus suffarcinatus
- Regimbartia attenuata
- Sphaeridium quinquemaculatum
- Sternolophus inconspicuus
- Sternolophus rufipes
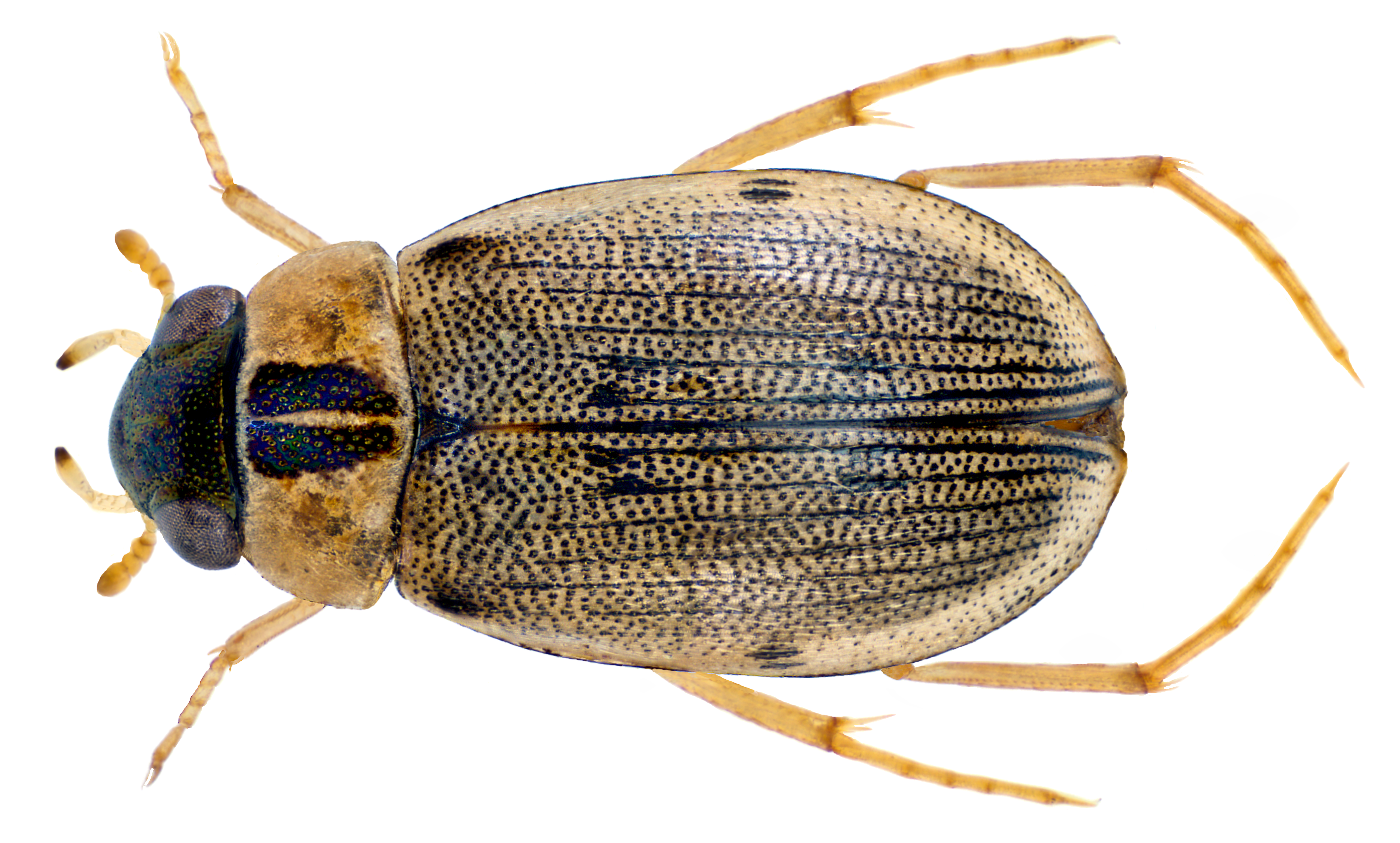
Berosus pulchellus

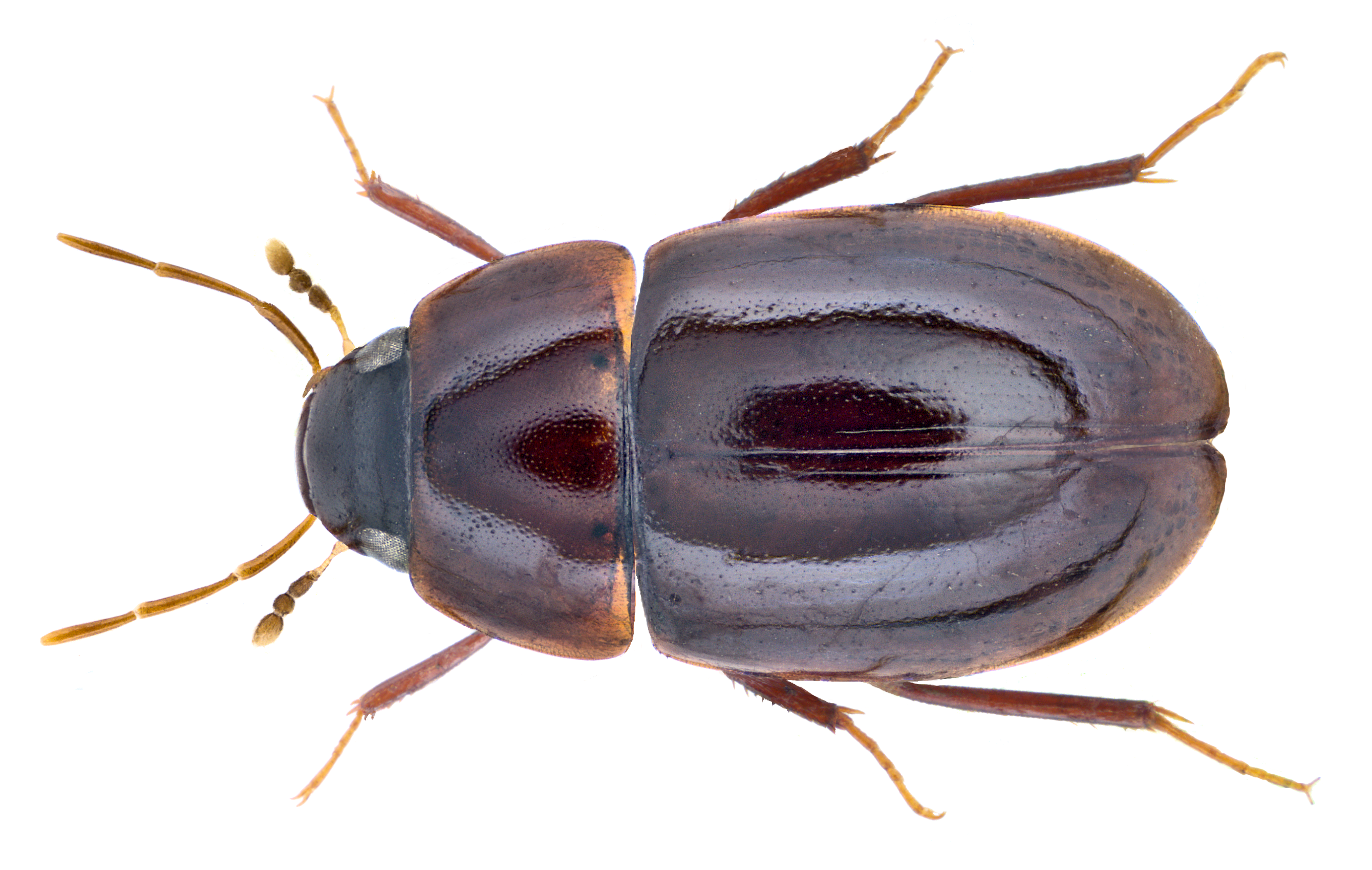
Chasmogenus abnormalis

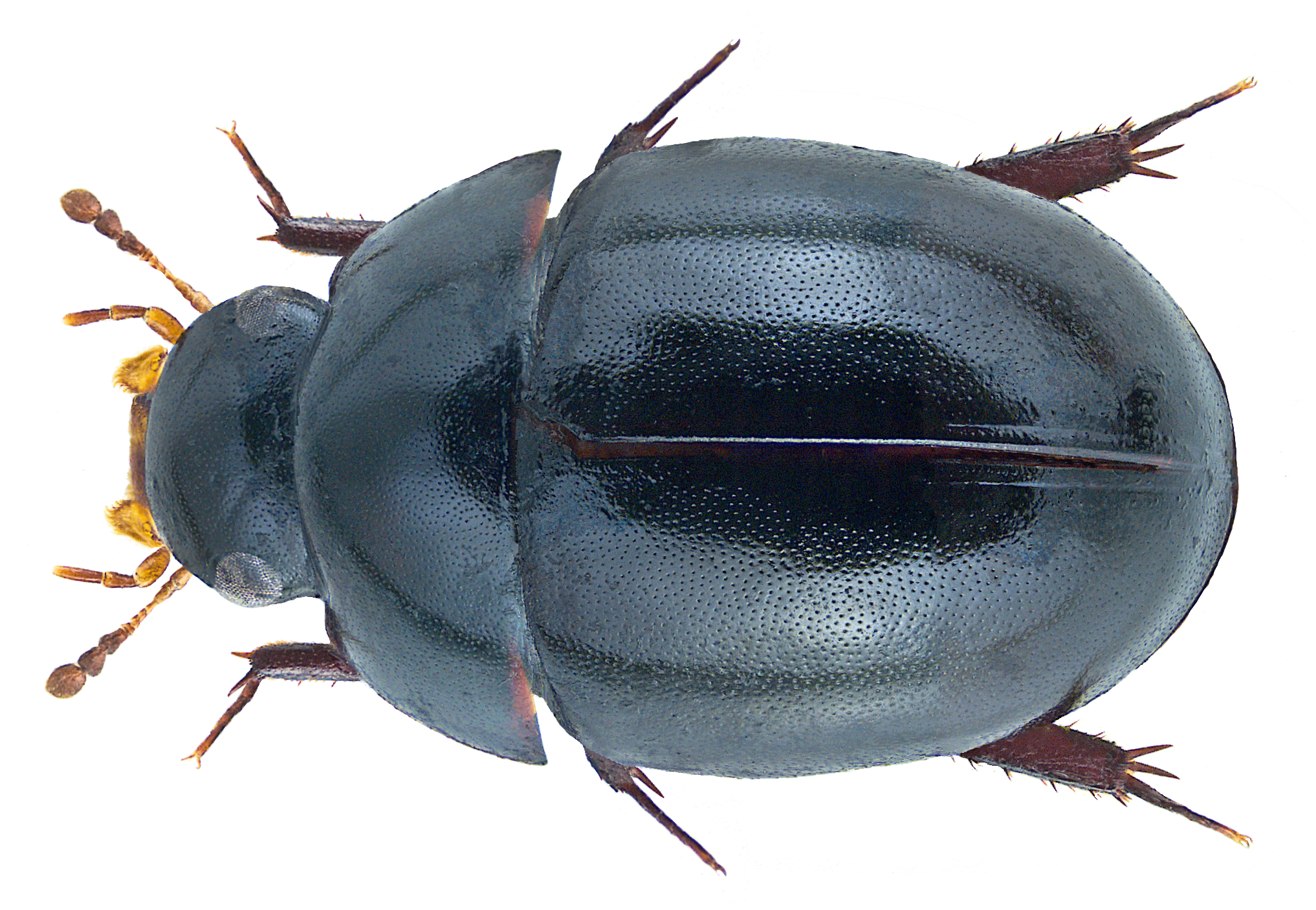
Coelostoma vitalisi

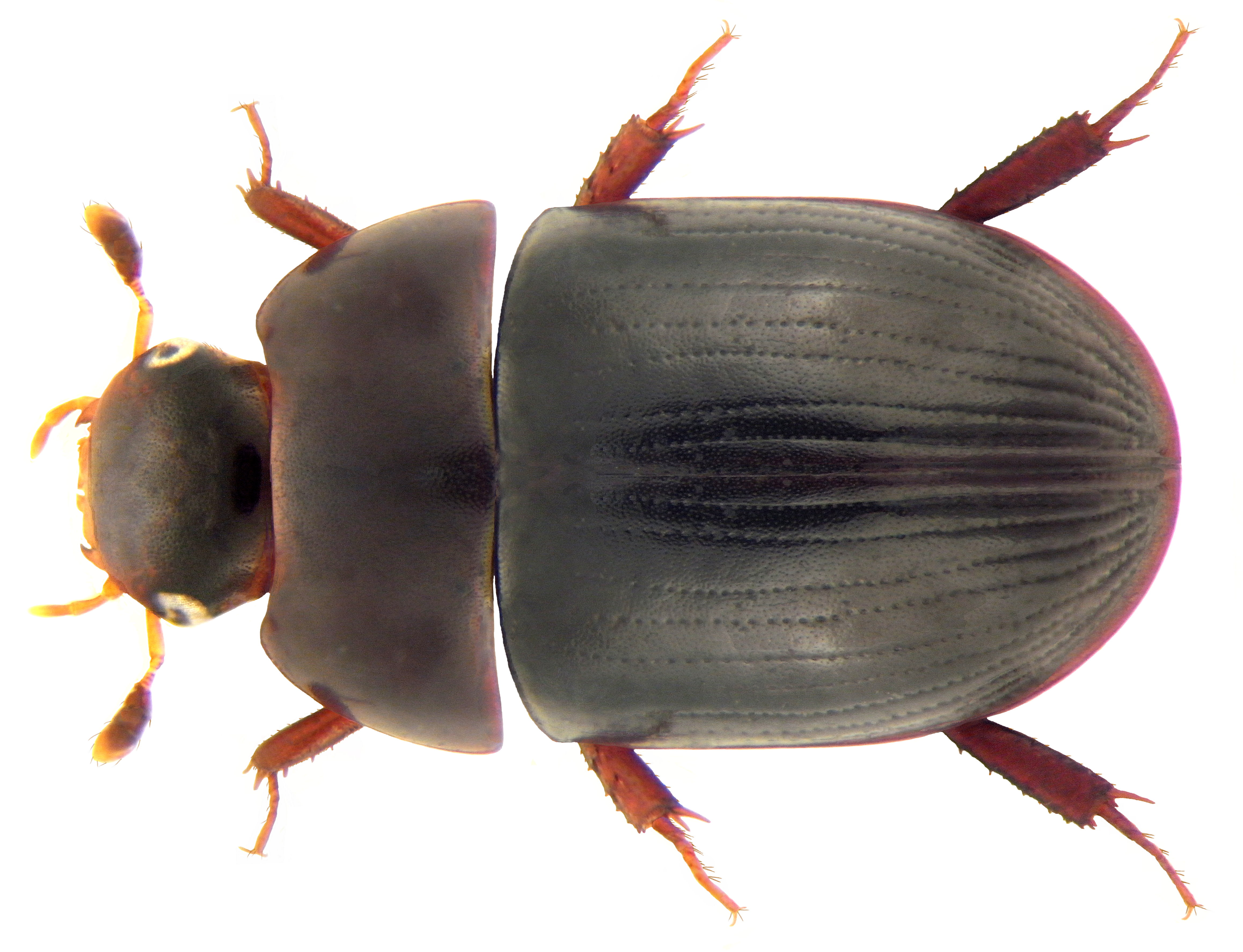
Dactylosternum abdominale

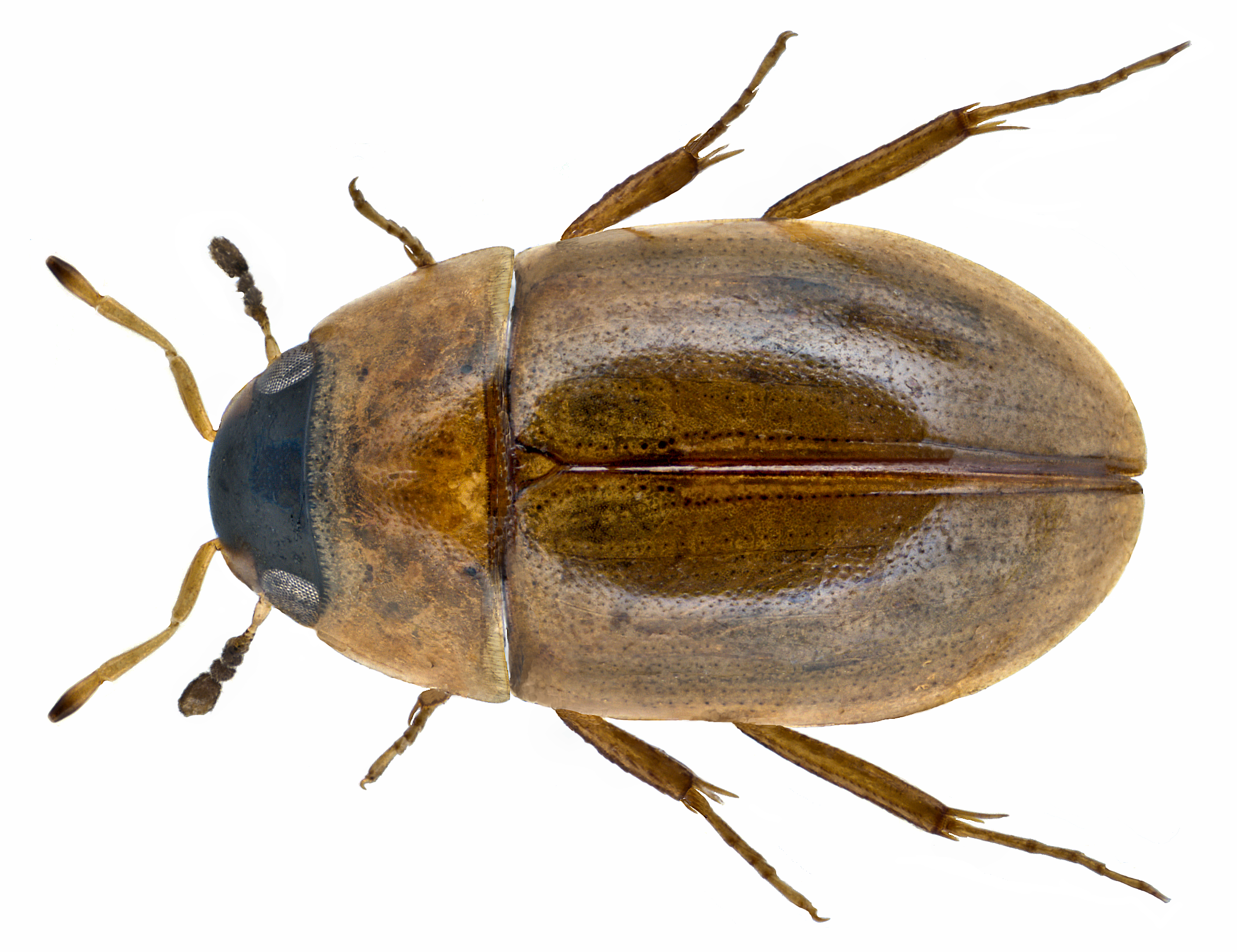
Enochrus esuriens

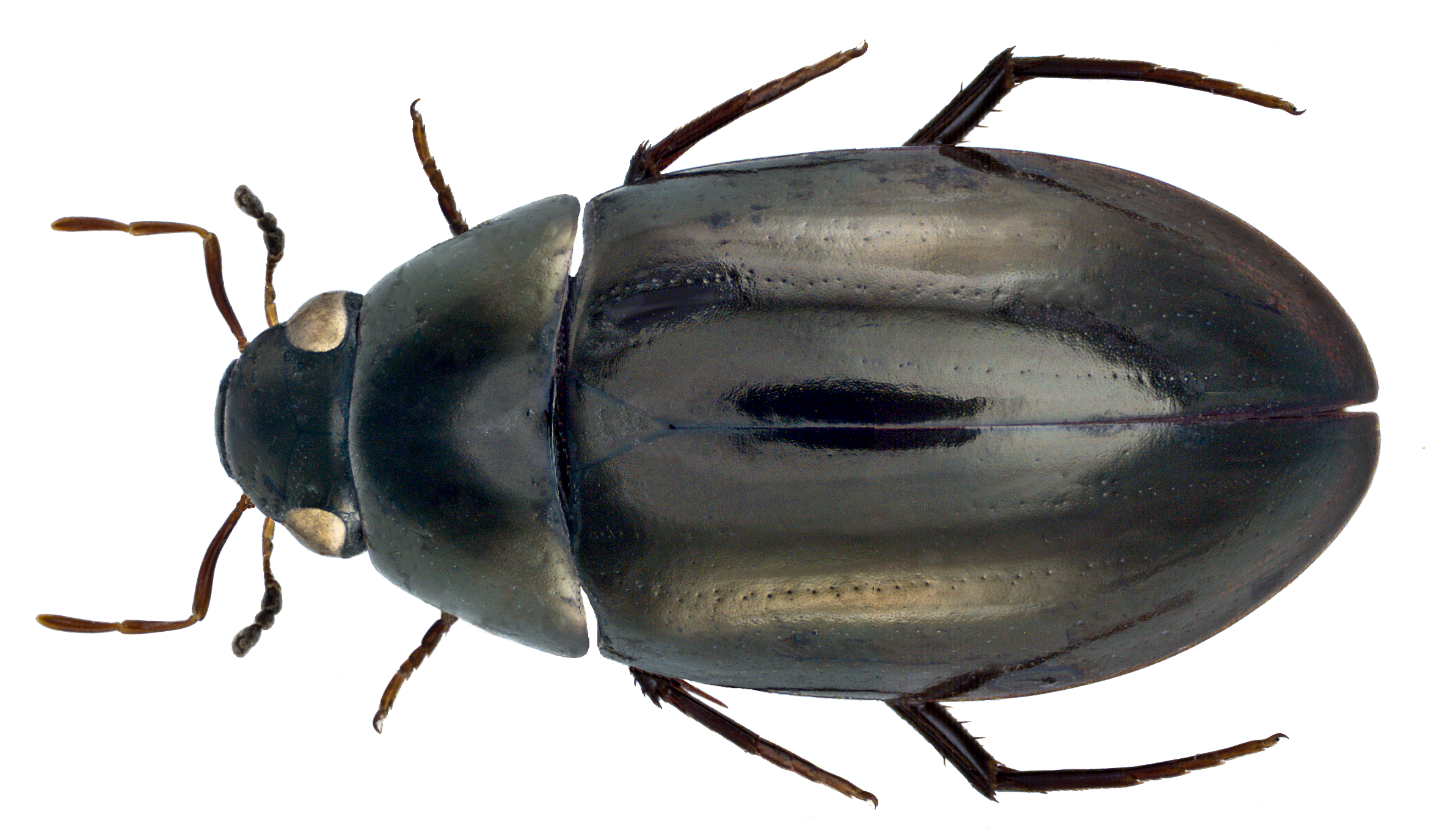
Sternolophus inconspicuus

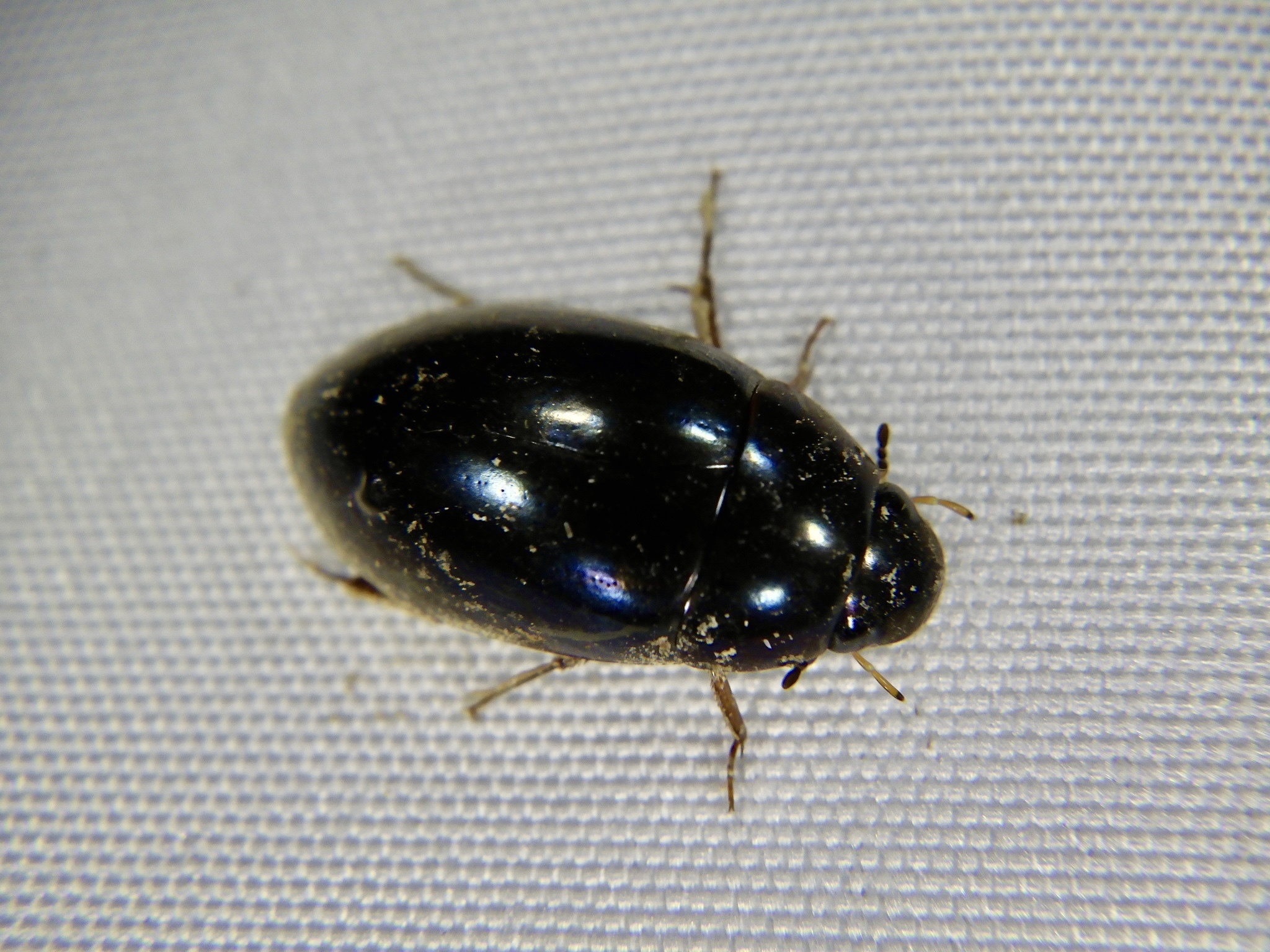
Sternolophus rufipes

=== Family: Hydroscaphidae - Skiff beetles ===
- Hydroscapha jaechi
- Hydroscapha monticola

=== Family: Jacobsoniidae - Jacobson's beetles ===
- Derolathrus ceylonicus

=== Family: Lampyridae - Fireflies ===
- Asymmetricata humeralis
- Abscondita chinensis
- Abscondita promelaena
- Baolacus ruficeps
- Ceylanidrillus basimaculatus
- Ceylanidrillus kandyanus
- Diaphanes uvaparanagama
- Gorhamia krombeini
- Harmatelia bilinea
- Hyperstoma marginata
- Hyperstoma wittmeri
- Luciola antennalis
- Luciola candezei
- Luciola intricata
- Luciola nicollieri
- Stenocladius horni
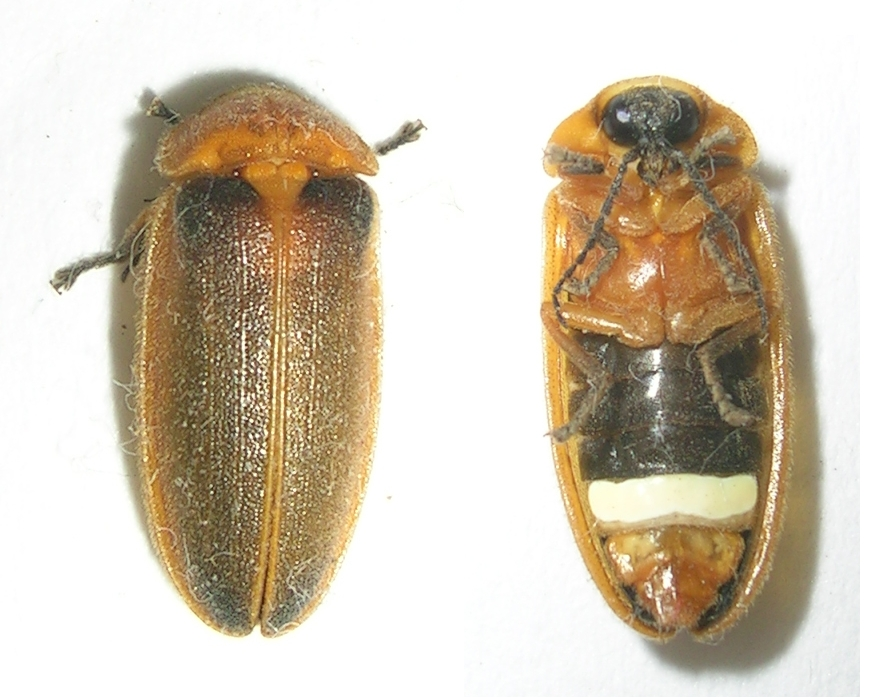
Asymmetricata humeralis

=== Family: Latridiidae - Minute brown scavenger beetles ===
- Besuchetia ceylanica
- Cartodere lobli
- Derolathrus ceylonicus
- Melanophthalma ceylanica

=== Family: Limnichidae - Minute mud beetles ===
- Byrrhinus cribrosus
- Byrrhinus latus
- Pelochares gibbipennis
- Pelochares orientalis
- Pelochares rugiventrus
- Pelochares sulciger

=== Family: Lucanidae - Stag beetles ===
- Aegus chelifer - ssp. kandiensis, chelifer
- Calcodes carinatus
- Calcodes cingalensis
- Dinonigidius bartolozzii
- Dinonigidius ahenobarbus
- Dorcus bennigseni
- Dorcus henryi
- Figulus aratus
- Figulus horni
- Figulus interruptus
- Figulus nitens
- Neolucanus sinicus - ssp. championi
- Odontolabis cingalensis
- Platyfigulus scorpio
- Prosopocoilus henryi
- Serrognathus gypaetus
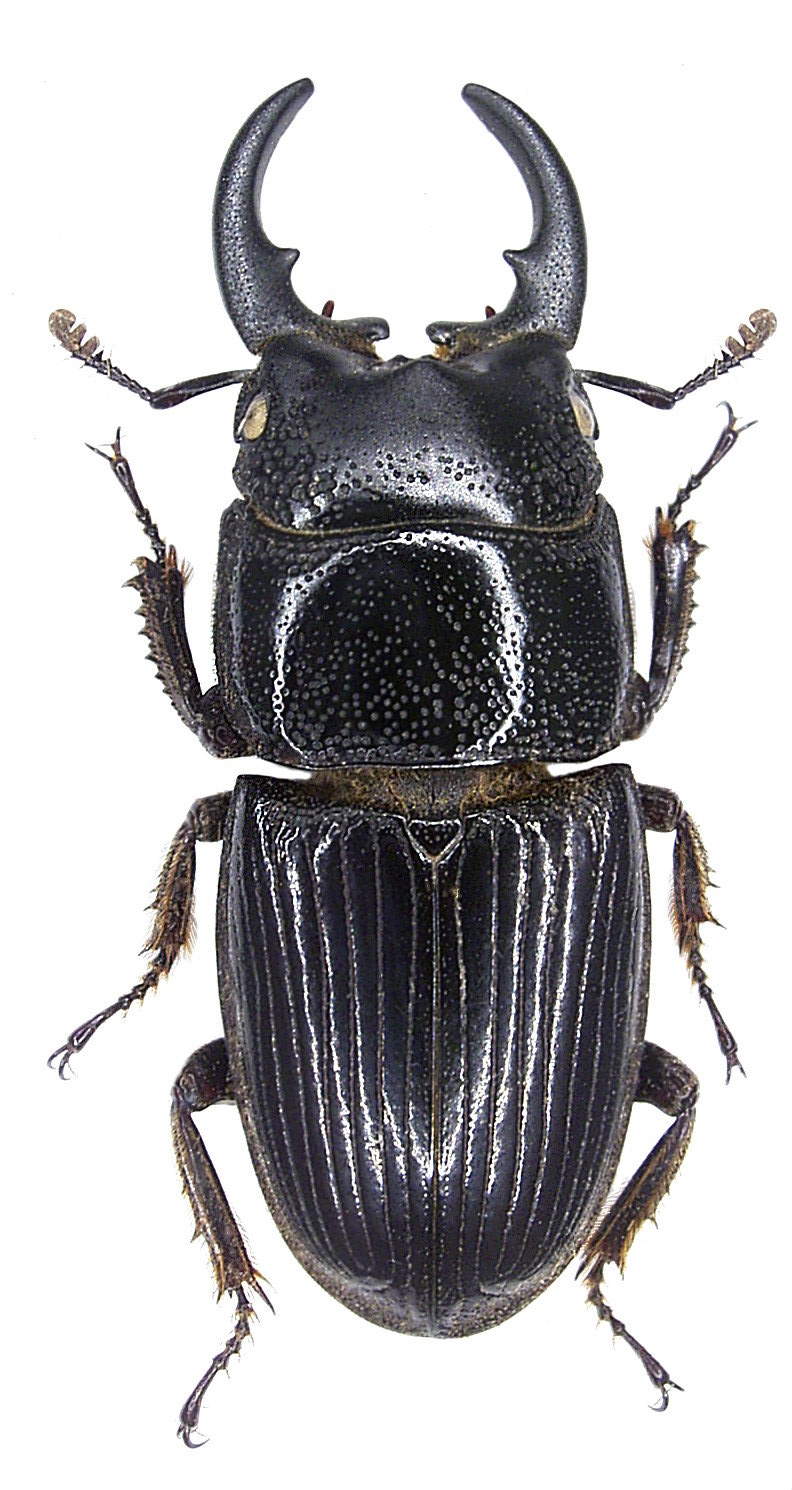
Aegus chelifer chelifer male

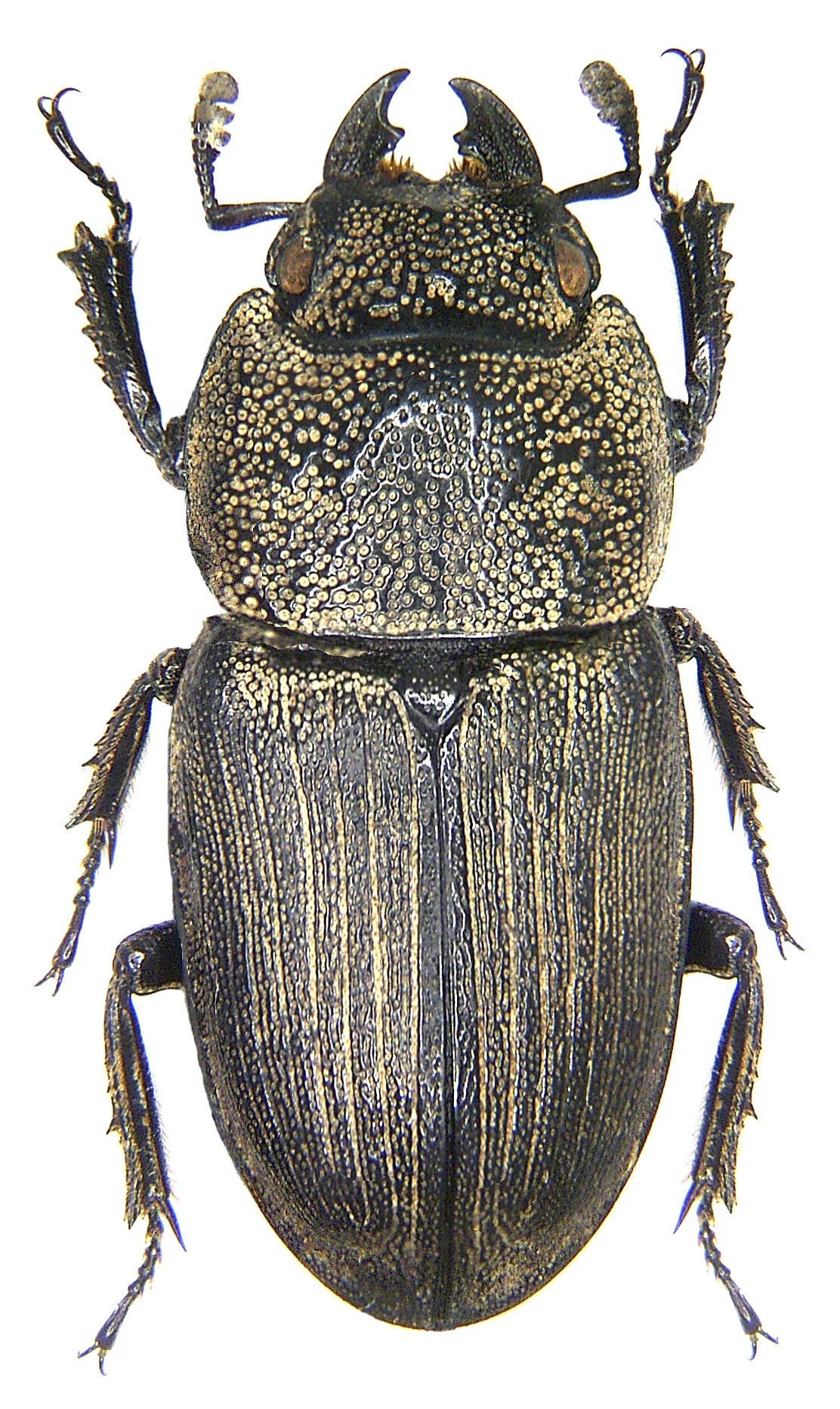
Aegus chelifer chelifer female

=== Family: Lycidae - Net-winged beetles ===
- Atelius acutecornis
- Cautires ceylonicus
- Cautires krombeini
- Ditoneces hirsutus
- Ditoneces hispidus
- Falsotrichalus lankaensis
- Lyropaeus ceylonicus
- Lyropaeus tamil
- Melaneros bicoloratus
- Melaneros inermis
- Melaneros kejvali
- Melaneros oculeus
- Melaneros uzeli
- Plateros aliquantulus
- Plateros arcuatus
- Plateros bidentatus
- Plateros firmus
- Plateros flexuosus
- Plateros kandiensis
- Plateros kleinei
- Plateros lanceolatus
- Plateros leechi
- Plateros nigrostriatus
- Plateros persubtilis
- Plateros portentificus
- Plateros pseudodispellens
- Plateros reconditus
- Plateros reflexus
- Plateros tenuis
- Plateros uncus
- Plateros vagatus
- Plateros viduus
- Plateros volatus
- Xylobanus minusculus
- Xylobanus villosus

=== Family: Lymexylidae - Ship-timber beetles ===
- Atractocerus emarginatus

=== Family: Meloidae - Blister beetles ===
- Eletica testacea
- Epicauta haematocephala
- Horia debyi
- Horia fabriciana
- Hycleus balteata
- Hycleus phaleratus
- Hycleus rouxi
- Mylabris alternata
- Mylabris ceylonica
- Mylabris orientalis
- Mylabris plagiata
- Mylabris pustulata
- Mylabris recognita
- Mylabris thunbergi
- Sybaris nigrifinis
- Sybaris praeustus
- Sybaris testaceus
- Sybaris yakkala
- Zonitoschema krombeini
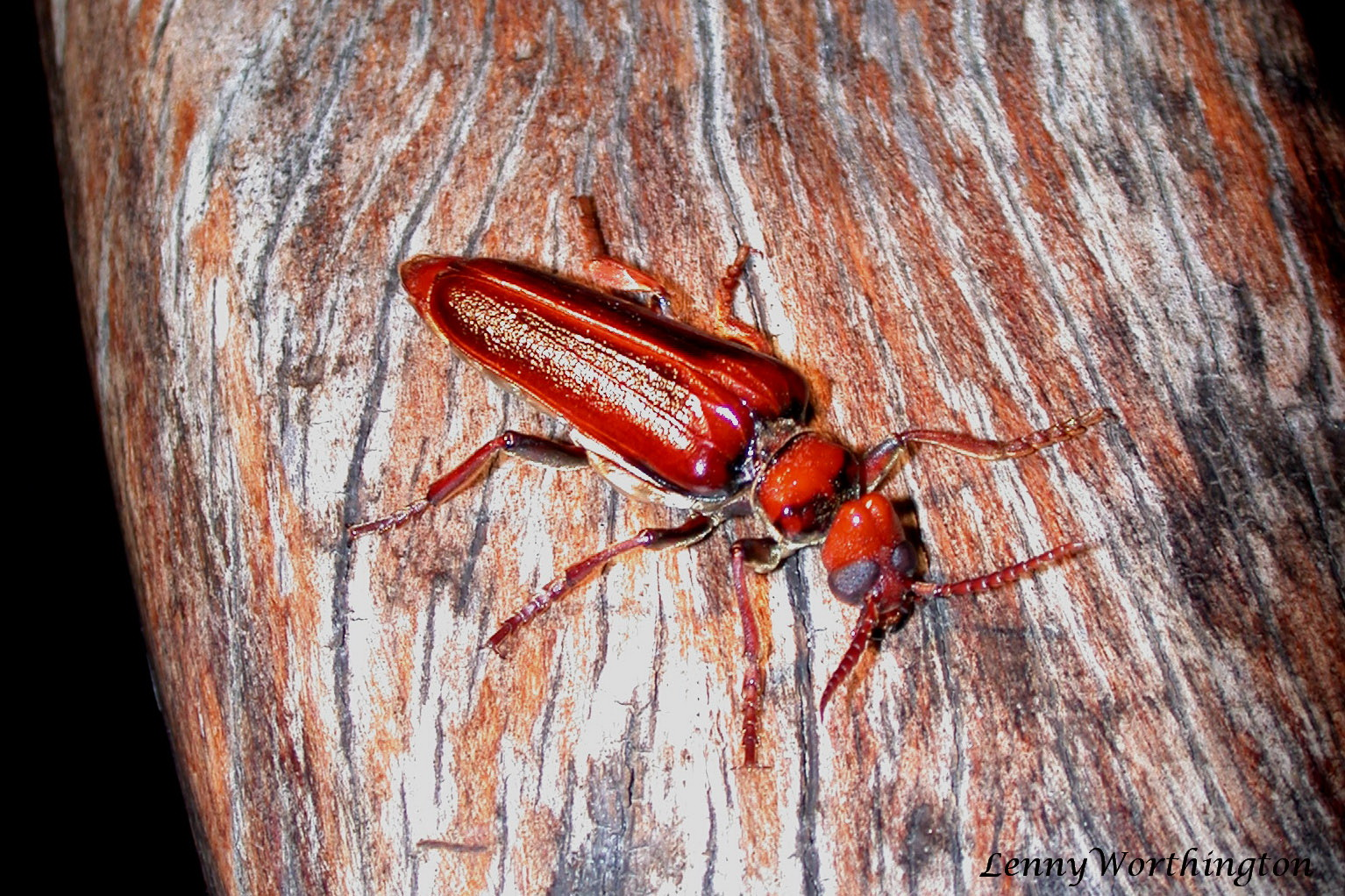
Eletica testacea

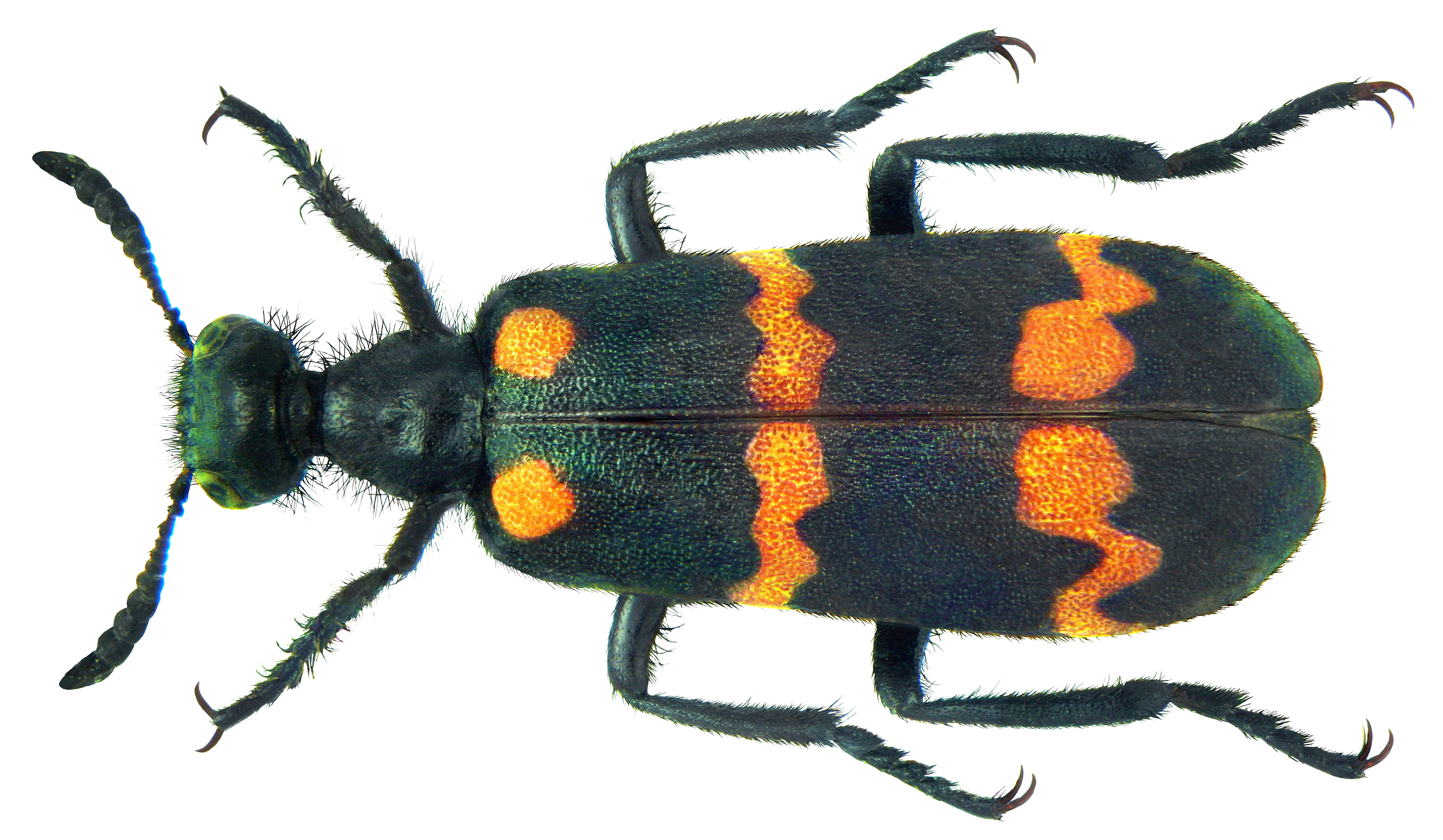
Mylabris pustulata

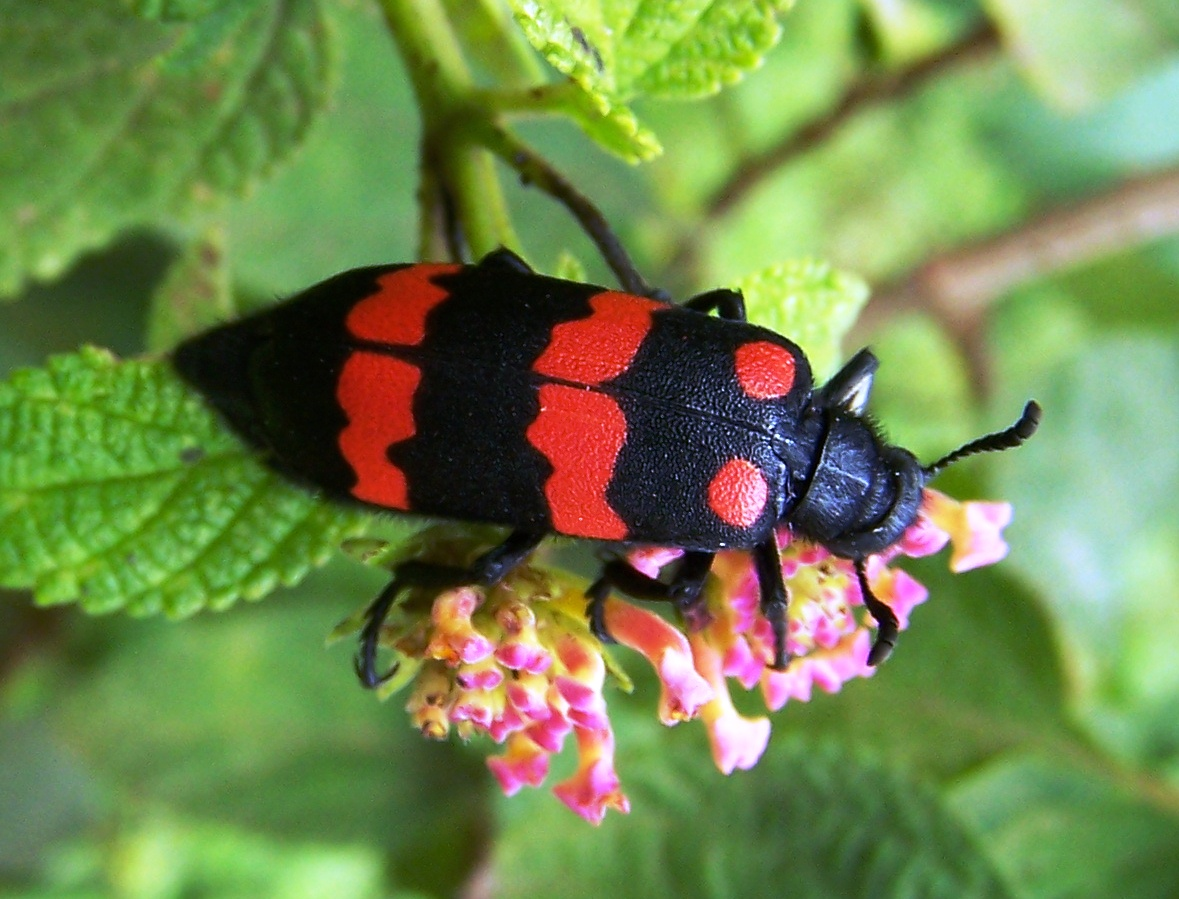
Mylabris pustulata

=== Family: Monotomidae - Root-eating beetles ===
- Monotoma longicollis
- Monotomopsis andrewesi
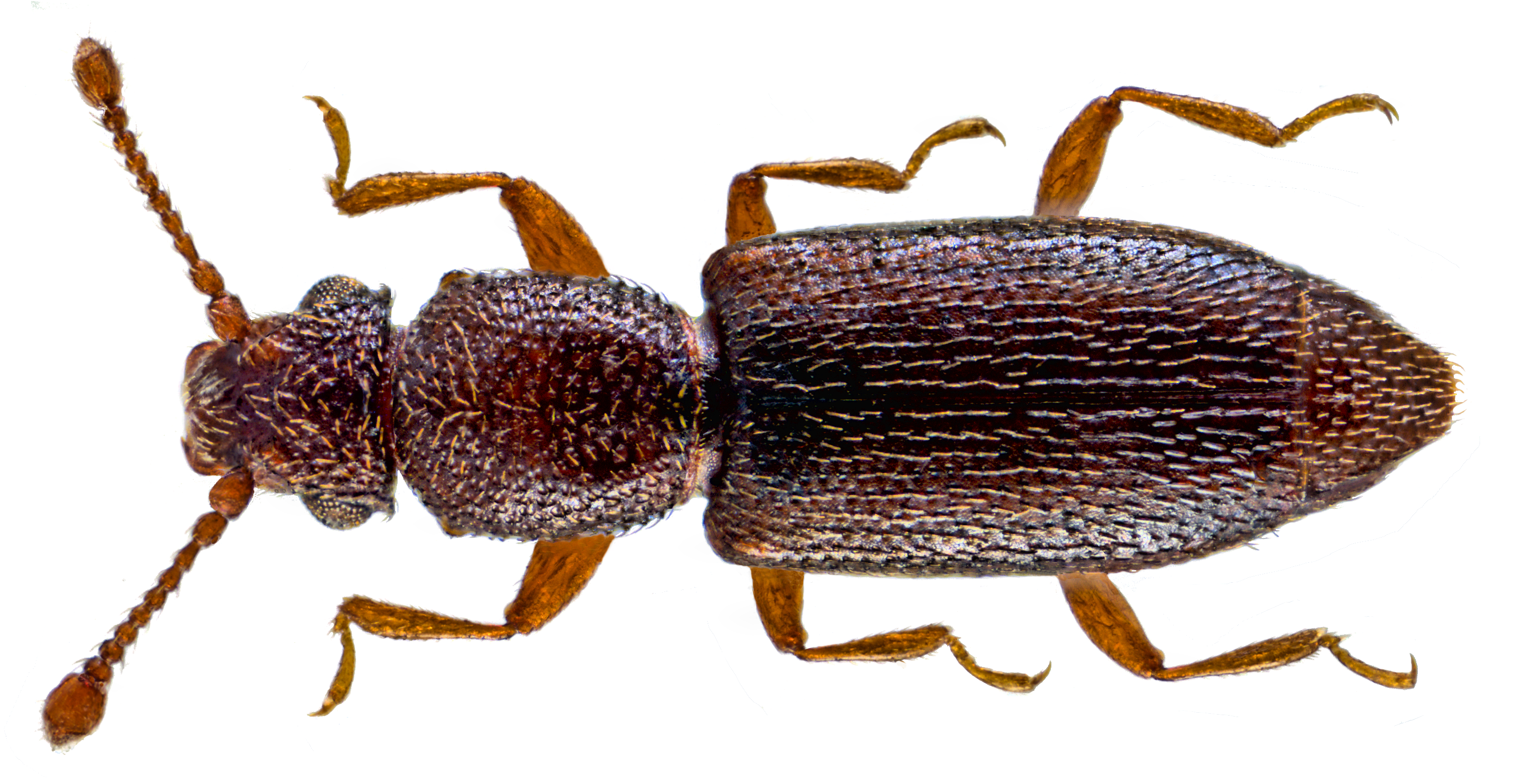
Monotoma longicollis

=== Family: Mordellidae - Pintail beetles ===
- Falsomordellistena konoi
- Hoshihananomia composita
- Mordella defectiva
- Mordellistena flaviceps
- Mordellistena rufotestacea
- Mordellistena trimaculata

=== Family: Murmidiidae ===
- Murmidius lankanus

=== Family: Mycetophagidae - Hairy fungus beetles ===
- Berginus maindroni
- Litargus taprobanoe

=== Family: Mycteridae - Palm and flower beetles ===
- Grammatodera bifasciata

=== Family: Nitidulidae - Sap beetles ===
- Brassicogethes aeneus
- Cyllodes bifascies
- Stelidota multiguttata
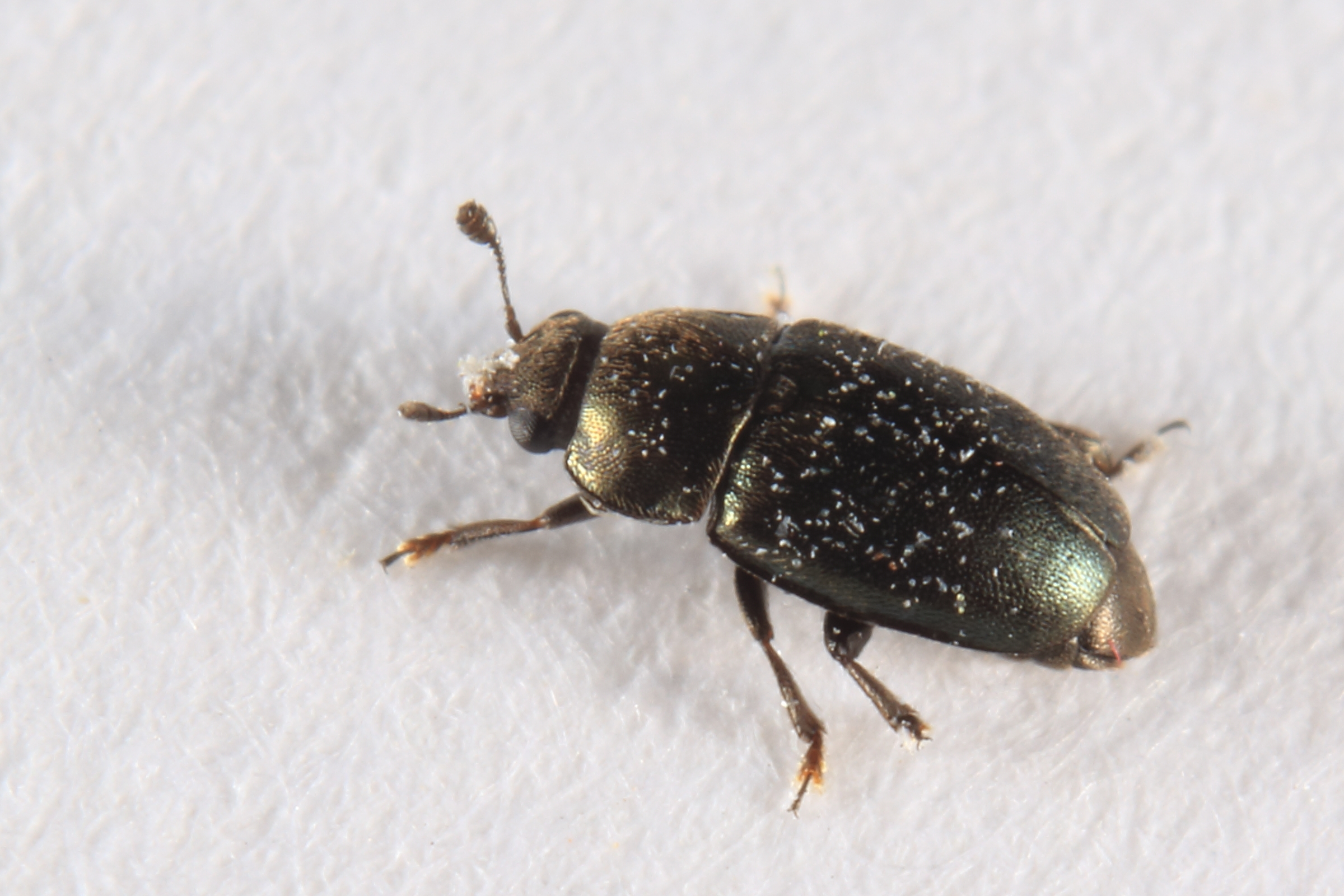
Brassicogethes aeneus

=== Family: Nosodendridae - Wounded-tree beetles ===
- Nosodendron ceylanicum

=== Family: Noteridae - Burrowing water beetles ===
- Canthydrus luctuosus

=== Family: Oedemeridae - False blister beetles ===
- Dryopomera ceylonica

=== Family: Omethidae - False soldier beetles ===
- Drilonius ceylanicus
- Drilonius keiseri
- Drilonius testaceicollis

=== Family: Passalidae - Bess beetles ===
- Aceraius comptoni
- Aceraius laevicollis
- Episphenus comptoni
- Episphenus flachi
- Episphenus moorei
- Leptaulax bicolor
- Macrolinus cartereti
- Macrolinus crenatipennis
- Macrolinus obesus
- Macrolinus rotundifrons
- Macrolinus waterhousei
- Stephanocephalus redtenbacheri
- Taeniocerus bicanthatus
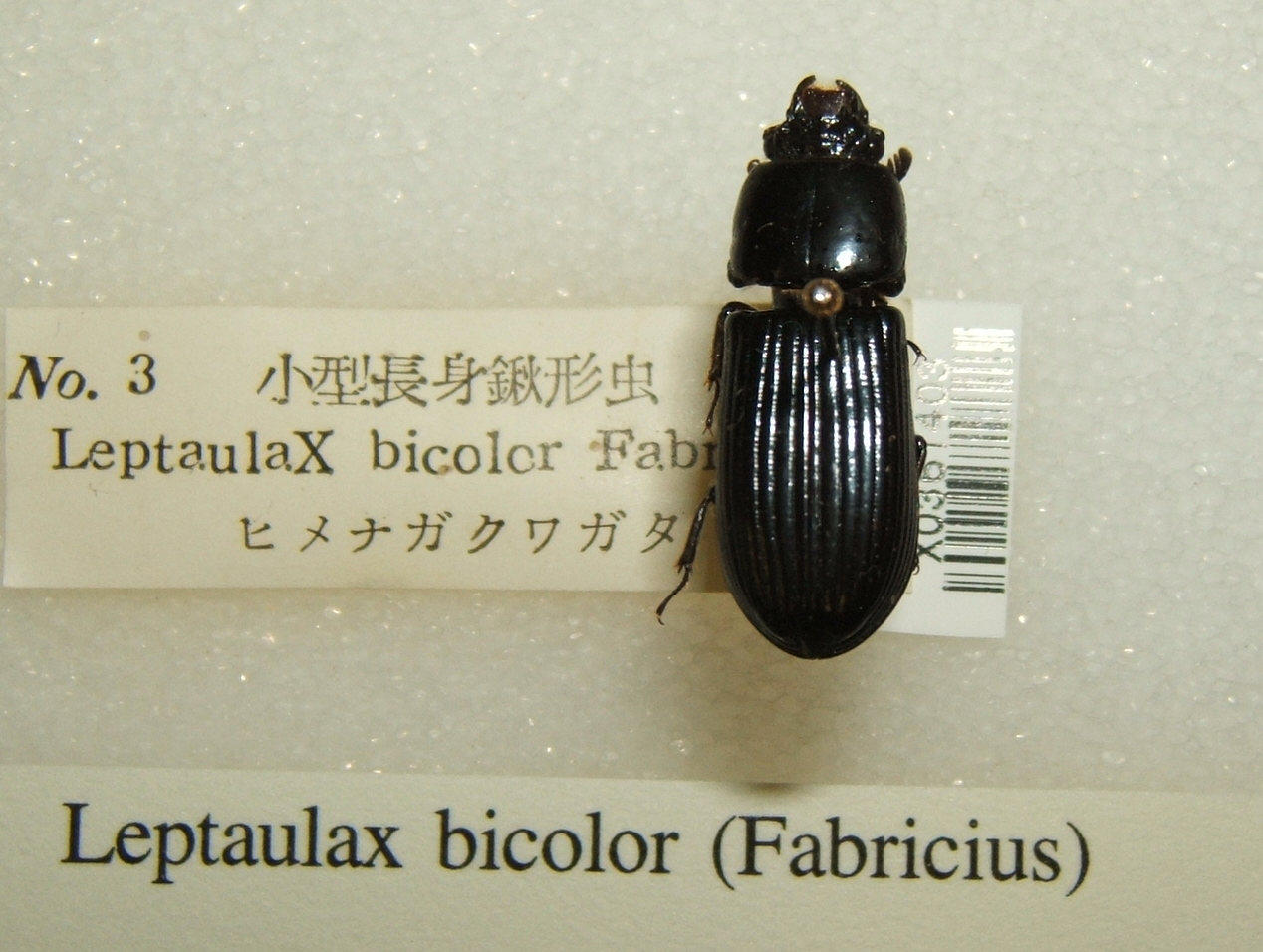
Leptaulax bicolor

=== Family: Prostomidae - Jugular-horned beetles ===
- Dryocora simoni
- Prostomis schlegeli

=== Family: Psephenidae - Water-penny beetles ===
- Eubrianax ceylonicus
- Eubrianax lioneli
- Macroeubria ceylonica
- Odontanax flinti

=== Family: Pterogeniidae ===
- Pterogenius besucheti

=== Family: Ptiliidae - Feather-wing beetles ===
- Acrotrichis discoloroides
- Acrotrichis orientalis

=== Family: Ptilodactylidae ===
- Ptilodactyla apicicornis
- Ptilodactyla humeralis

=== Family: Ptinidae - Spider beetles ===
- Myrmecoptinus subsuturalis
- Ptinus brevithorax
- Ptinus lemoldes
- Ptinus nigerrimus

=== Family: Rhynchitidae - Tooth-nosed snout weevils ===
- Arodepus marginellus
- Auletobius subgranulatus
- Auletobius testaceipennis
- Caenorhinus fuscipennis
- Caenorhinus marginatus
- Caenorhinus rufipallens
- Cartorhynchites flavipedestris
- Elautobius horni
- Epirhynchites giganteus
- Eugnamptobius flavipes
- Maculinvolvulus vestitoides
- Maculorhinus fasciatus
- Metarhynchites nalandaicus
- Metarhynchites parvulus
- Parinvolvulus ceylonensis
- Pseudodeporaus ceylonensis
- Pseudomesauletes ceylonicus
- Pseudomesauletes gallensis
- Pseudomesauletes maculatus
- Synaptops suffundens
- Thompsonirhinus amictus
- Thompsonirhinus ceylonensis
- Thompsonirhinus clavatus
- Thompsonirhinus restituens

=== Family: Salpingidae - Narrow-waisted bark beetles ===
- Elacatis ceylanicus
- Elacatis lyncca
- Lissodema ceylonicum
- Lissodema lewisi
- Ocholissa bicolor
- Rhinosimus ceylonicus

=== Family: Scarabaeidae - Scarab beetles ===
- Agestrata orichalca - ssp. nigrita
- Alissonotum piceum
- Anthracophora crucifera
- Caccobius aterrimus
- Caccobius diminutivus
- Caccobius indicus
- Caccobius meridionalis
- Caccobius rufipennis
- Caccobius unicornis
- Caccobius vulcanus
- Campsiura nigripennis - ssp. cingalensis
- Catharsius capucinus
- Catharsius granulatus
- Catharsius molossus
- Catharsius pithecius
- Chaetadoretus infans
- Chaetadoretus lasiopygyus
- Chaetadoretus mus
- Chaetadoretus rugosus
- Chaetadoretus silonicus
- Chaetadoretus singhalensis
- Chiron cylindrus
- Cleptocaccobius durantoni
- Cleptocaccobius inermis
- Clinteria ceylonensis
- Clinteria chloronota
- Clinteria coerulea - ssp. megaspilota
- Clinteria imperialis
- Clinteria jansoni
- Clinteria keiseri
- Clinteria klugi - ssp. rufipennis
- Clinteria pantherina
- Clyster itys
- Coenochilus taprobanicus
- Copris fricator
- Copris repertus
- Copris signatus
- Copris sodalis
- Dasyvalgus addendus
- Delopleurus parvus
- Dicheros bimacula
- Digitonthophagus bonasus
- Digitonthophagus gazella
- Dipelicus bidens
- Dipelicus daedalus
- Dipelicus hircus
- Eophileurus cingalensis - ssp. decatenatus
- Euselates scenica
- Gametis versicolor
- Garreta smaragdifer
- Glycosia tricolor
- Glycyphana horsfieldi - ssp. aurulenta
- Gymnopleurus cyaneus
- Gymnopleurus gemmatus
- Gymnopleurus koenigi
- Gymnopleurus miliaris
- Gymnopleurus parvus
- Gymnopleurus sericeifrons
- Haroldius herrenorum
- Haroldius krali
- Heliocopris ares
- Heliocopris bucephalus
- Heteronychus krombeini
- Heterorhina elegans
- Liatongus rhadamistus
- Maladera cervicornis
- Maladera galdaththana
- Neoserica dharmapriyai
- Neosisyphus tarantula
- Ochicanthon ceylonicus
- Ochicanthon cingalensis
- Onitis crenatus
- Onitis philemon
- Onitis singhalensis
- Onitis subopacus
- Onthophagus capitosus
- Onthophagus centricornis
- Onthophagus cervus
- Onthophagus ceylonicus
- Onthophagus cryptogenus
- Onthophagus dama
- Onthophagus falsus
- Onthophagus favrei
- Onthophagus fissicornis
- Onthophagus frontalis
- Onthophagus fuscopunctatus
- Onthophagus gemma
- Onthophagus gravis
- Onthophagus hastifer
- Onthophagus heterorrhinus
- Onthophagus hystrix
- Onthophagus keiseri
- Onthophagus laevigatus
- Onthophagus ludio
- Onthophagus luridipennis
- Onthophagus martialis
- Onthophagus militaris
- Onthophagus modestus
- Onthophagus negligens
- Onthophagus occipitalis
- Onthophagus ochreatus
- Onthophagus oculatus
- Onthophagus parvulus
- Onthophagus politus
- Onthophagus pusillus
- Onthophagus pygmaeus
- Onthophagus quadridentatus
- Onthophagus rectecornutus
- Onthophagus rufulgens
- Onthophagus regalis
- Onthophagus solmani
- Onthophagus sparsepunctatus
- Onthophagus spinifex
- Onthophagus taprobanus
- Onthophagus tritinctus
- Onthophagus turbatus
- Onthophagus unifasciatus
- Onthophagus vacca
- Oreoderus insularis
- Orphnus parvus
- Oryctes gnu
- Oryctes rhinoceros
- Panelus ceylonicus
- Panelus fallax
- Panelus horni
- Panelus imitator
- Panelus pernitidus
- Panelus puncticollis
- Panelus rufocuprea
- Panelus setosus
- Panelus whitehousei
- Panelus wiebesi
- Paragymnopleurus melanarius
- Phaedotrogus ceylonicus
- Phalops divisus
- Phyllognathus dionysius
- Proagoderus pactolus
- Protaetia alboguttata
- Protaetia aurichalcea
- Protaetia ceylanica
- Protaetia cupripes - ssp. germar
- Scarabaeus erichsoni
- Scarabaeus gangeticus
- Scarabaeus sanctus
- Selaserica athukoralai
- Sisyphus crispatus - ssp. hirtus
- Sisyphus indicus
- Sisyphus longipes
- Spilophorus cretosus
- Taeniodera flavomaculata
- Taeniodera halyi
- Taeniodera quadrivittata
- Thaumastopeus ceylonicus
- Tibiodrepanus hircus
- Tibiodrepanus setosus
- Xylotrupes gideon - ssp. socrates
- Xylotrupes meridionalis
- Xylotrupes taprobanus
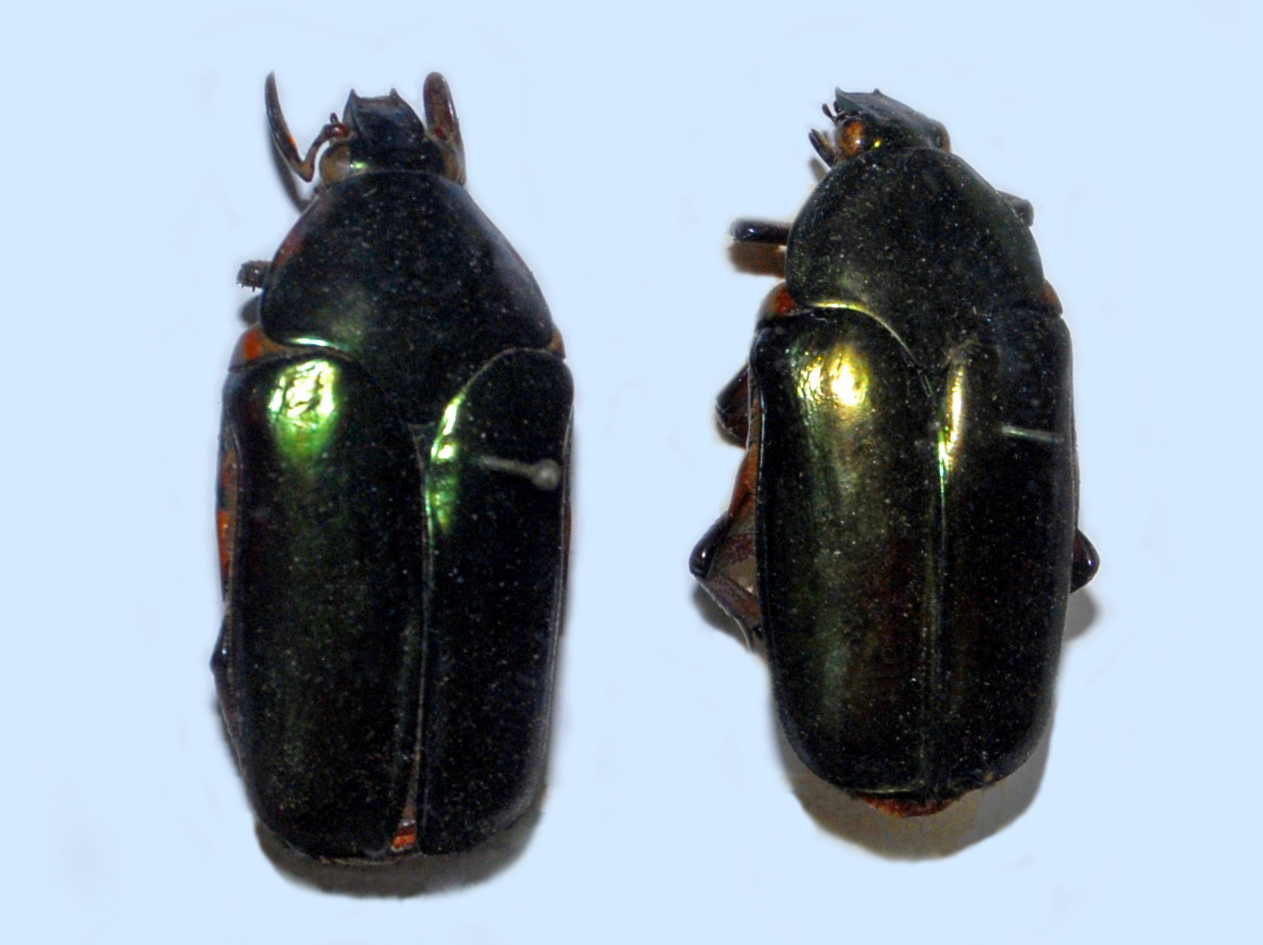
Agestrata orichalca

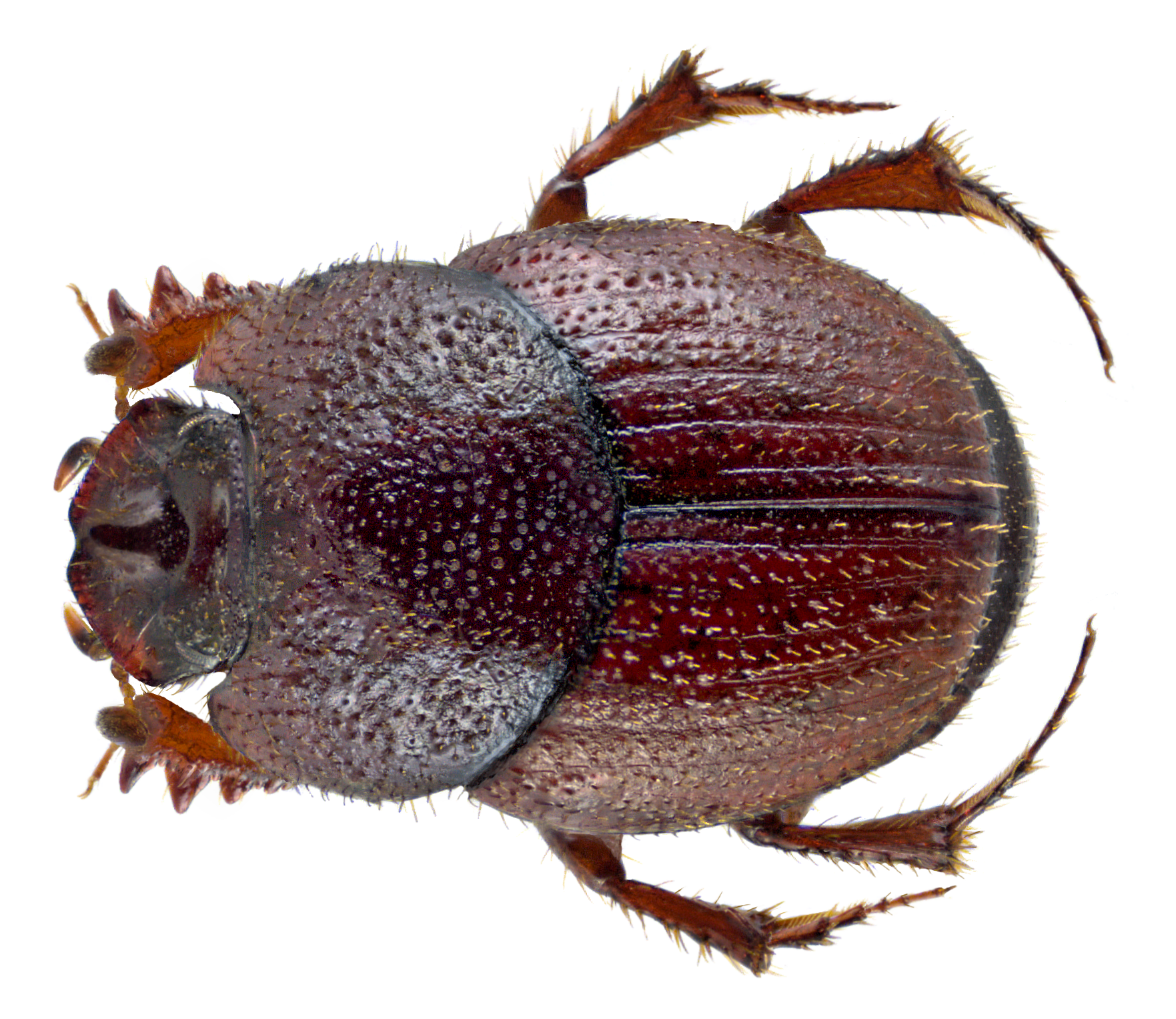
Caccobius unicornis male

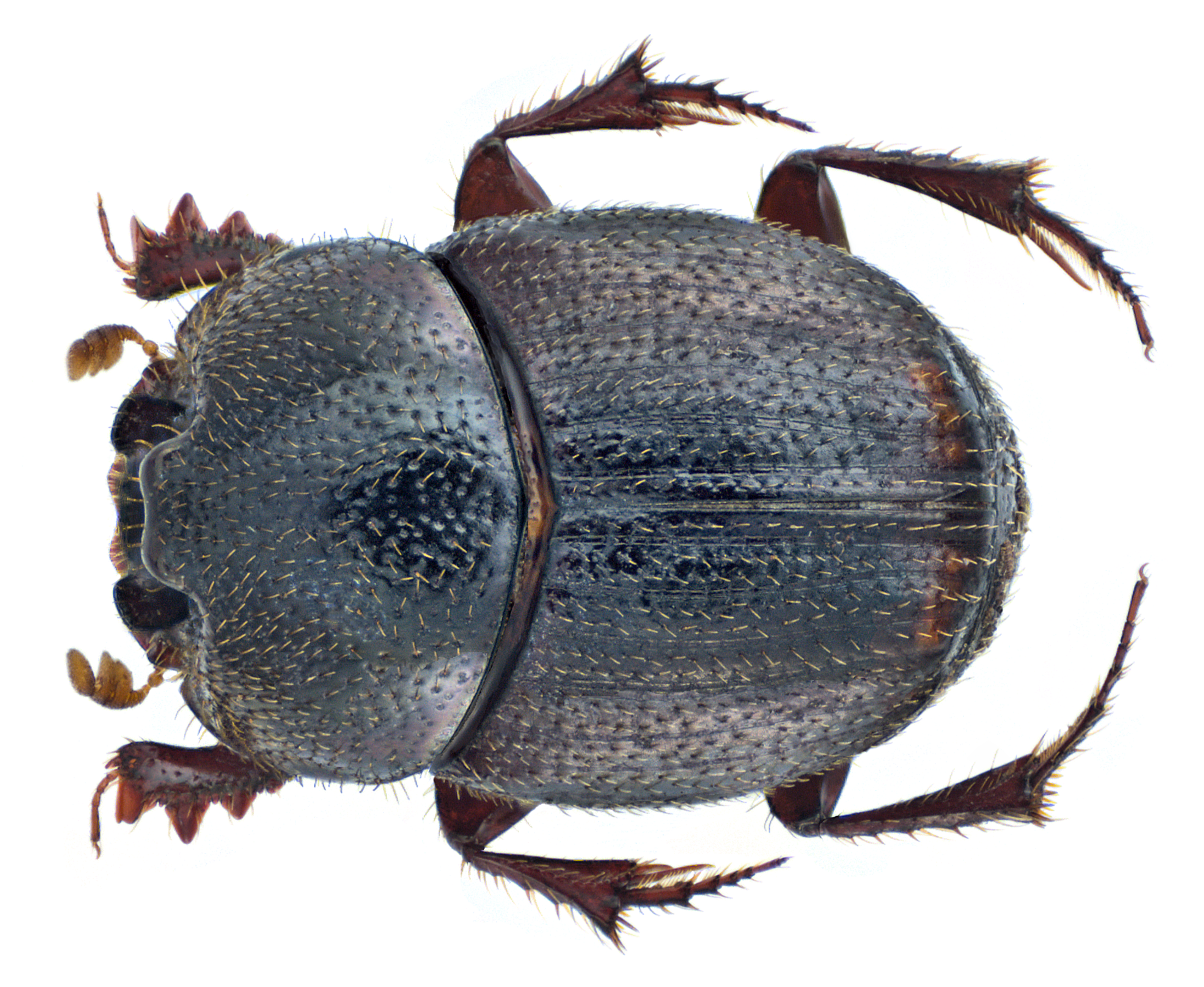
Caccobius vulcanus male

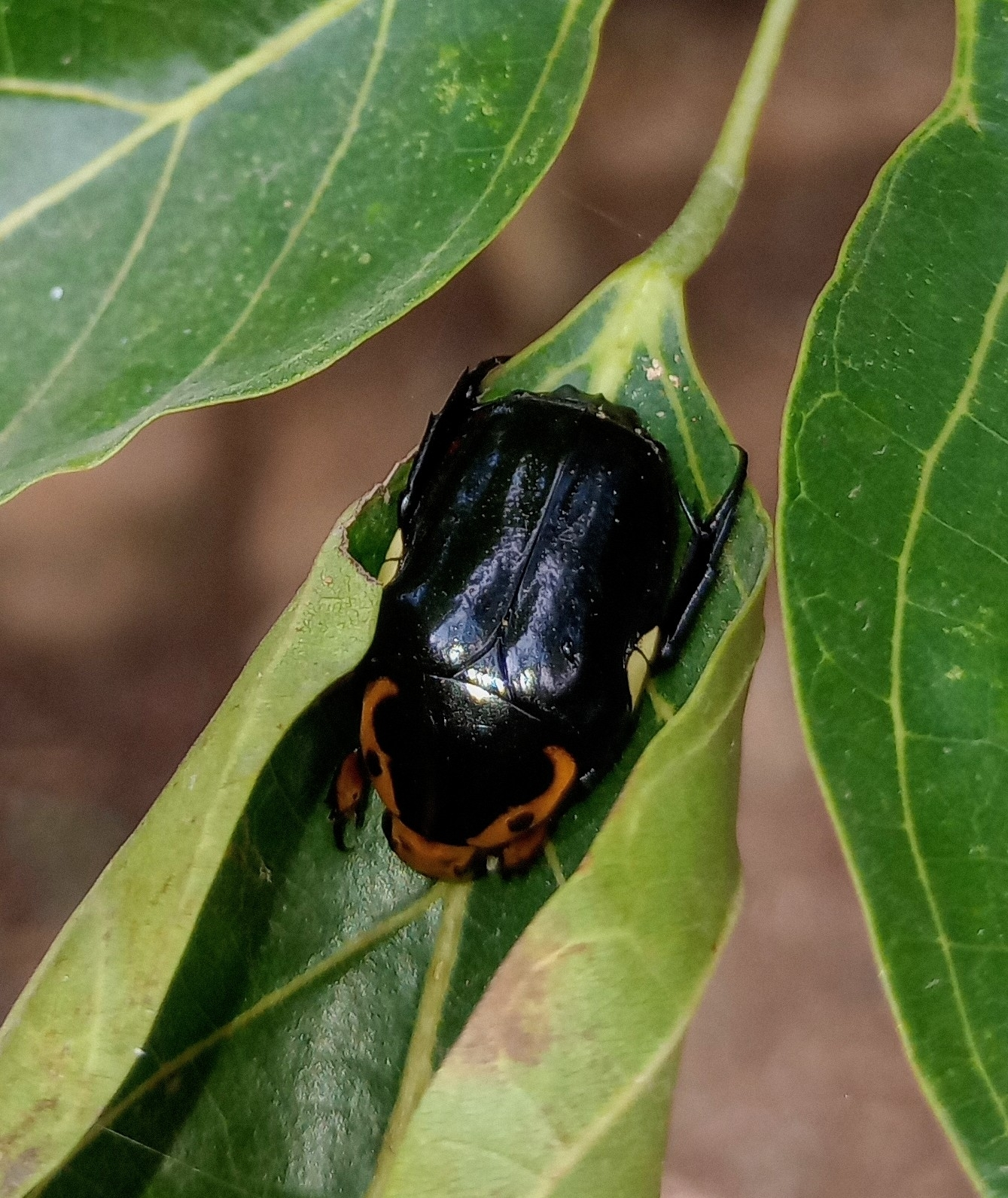
Campsiura nigripennis

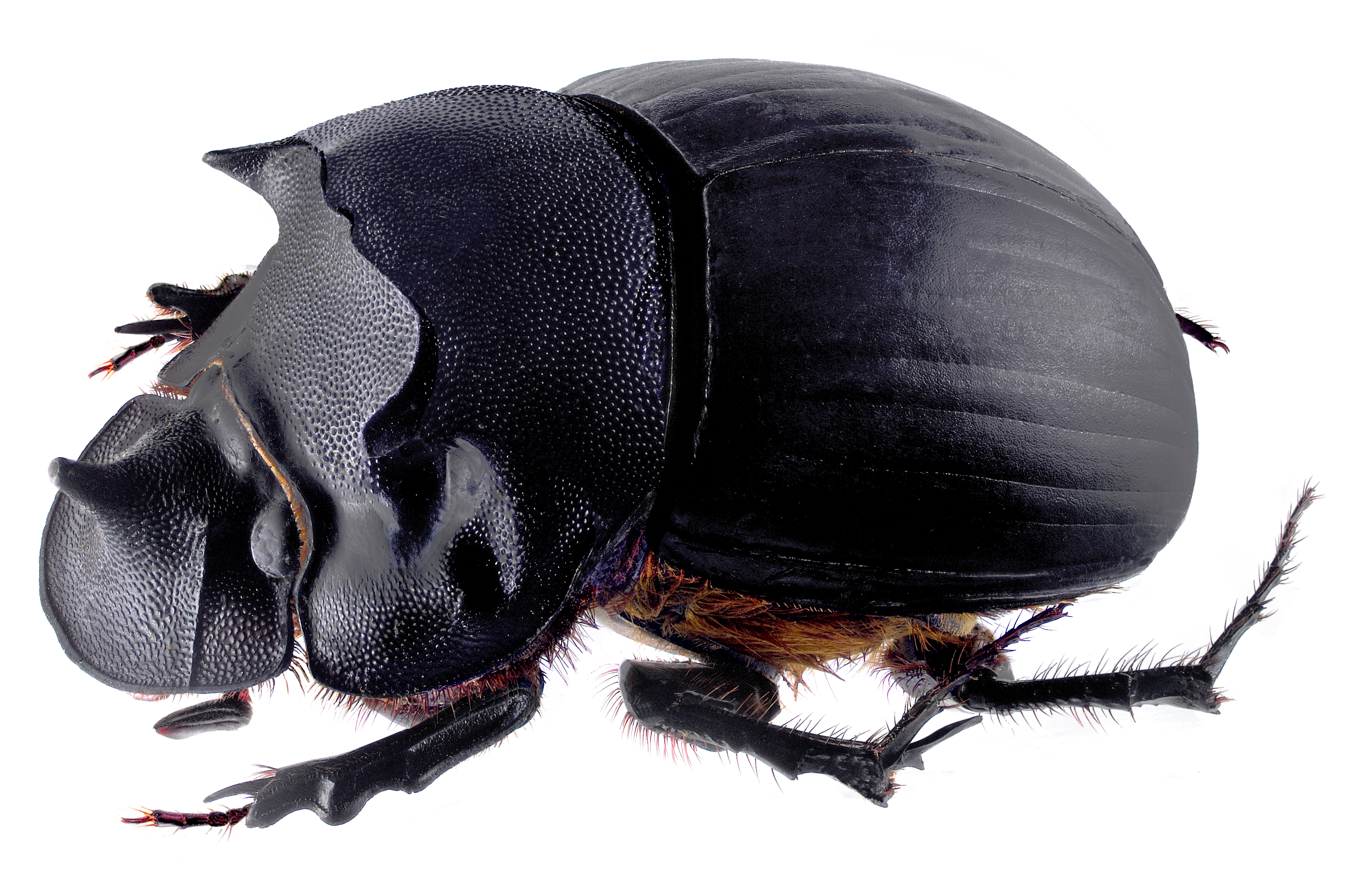
Catharsius granulatus male

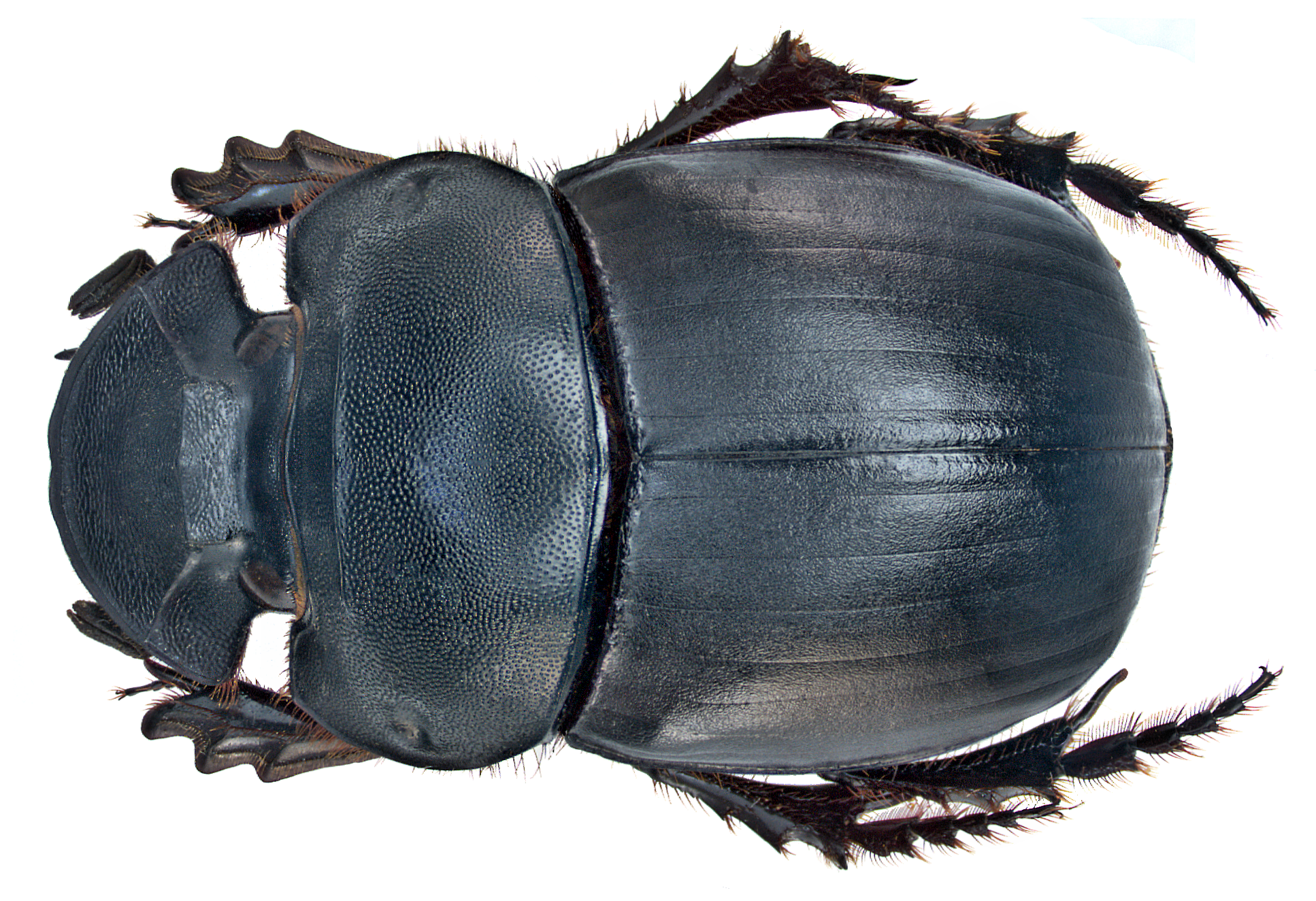
Catharsius molossus female

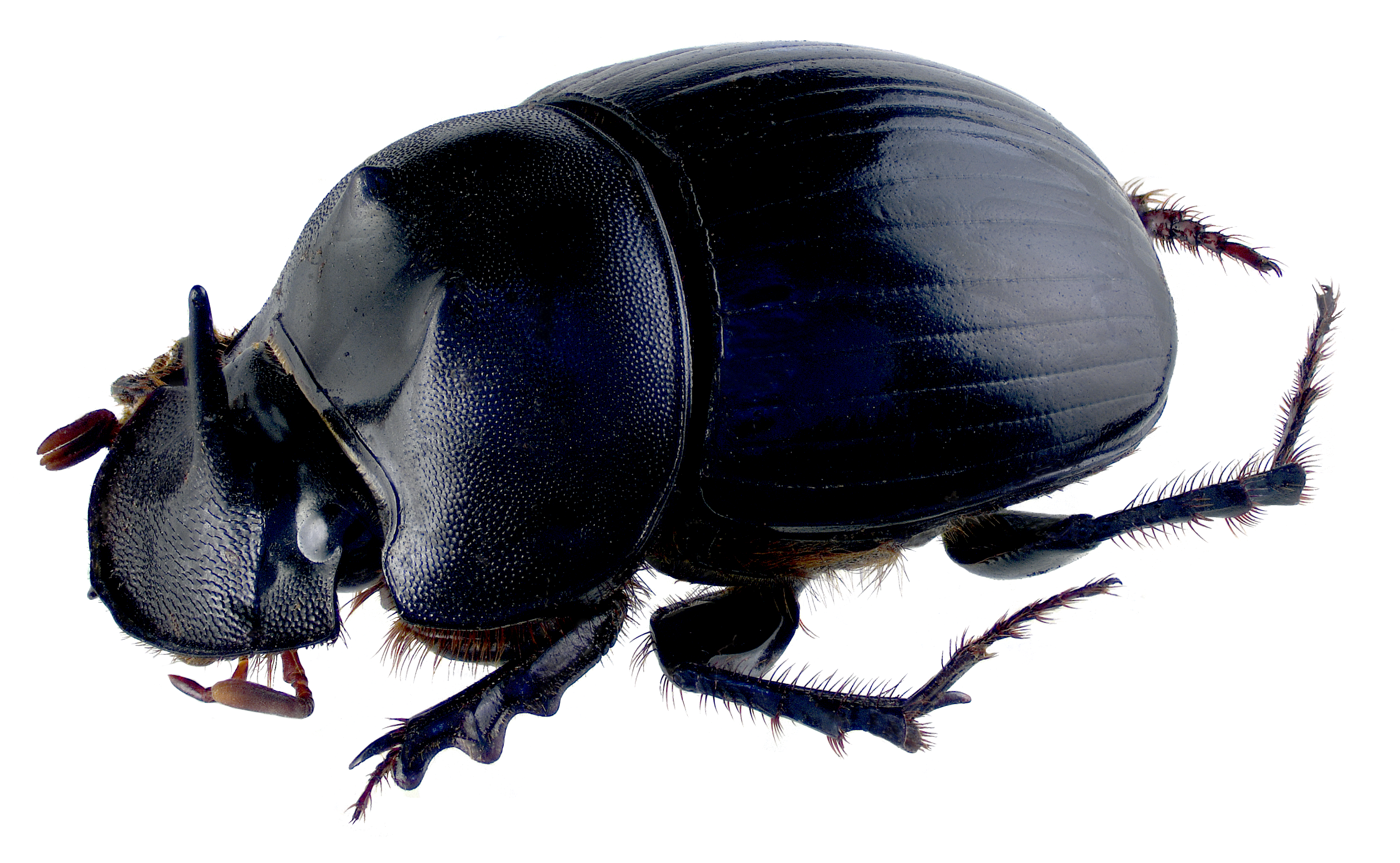
Catharsius pithecius

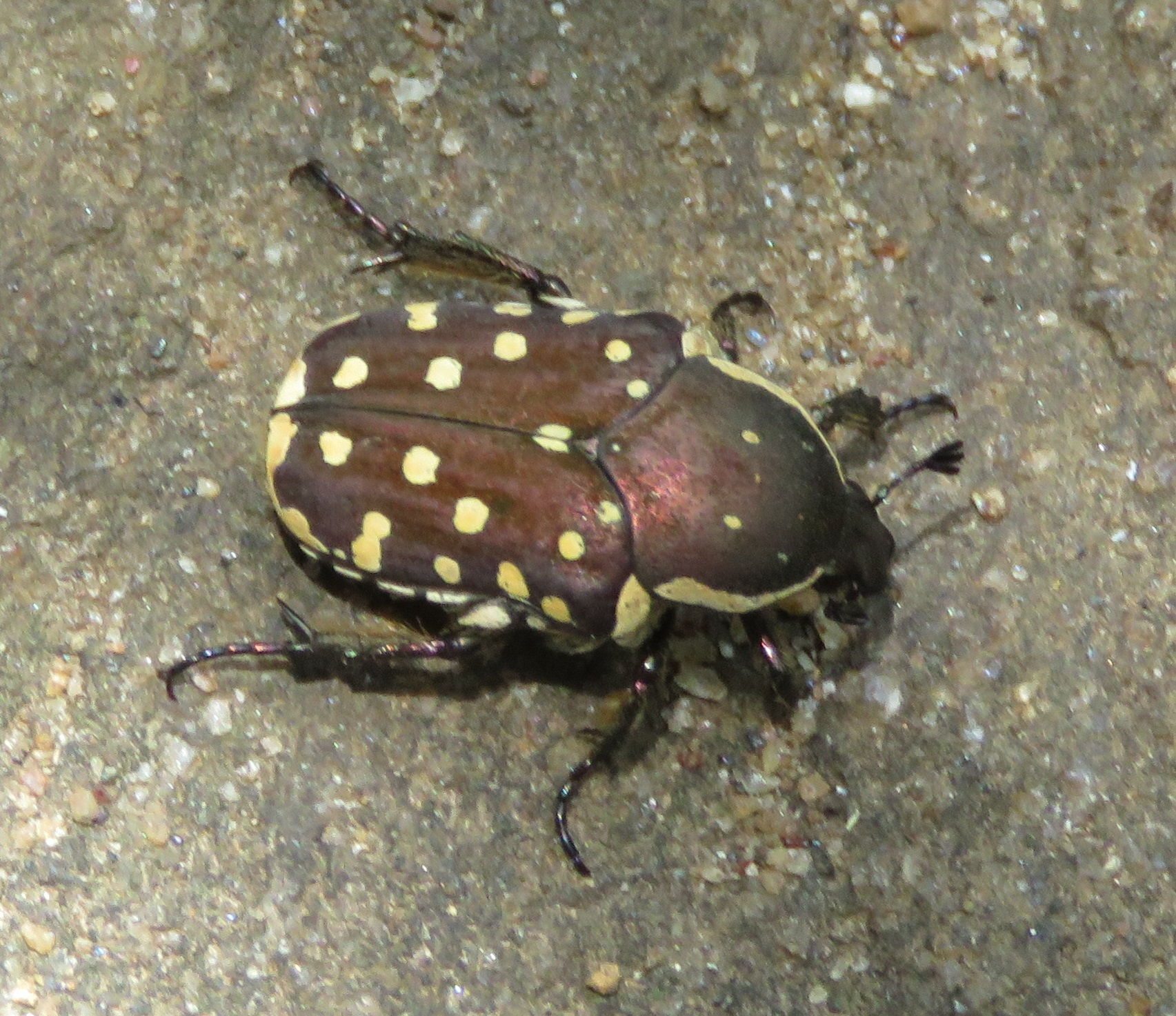
Clinteria chloronota

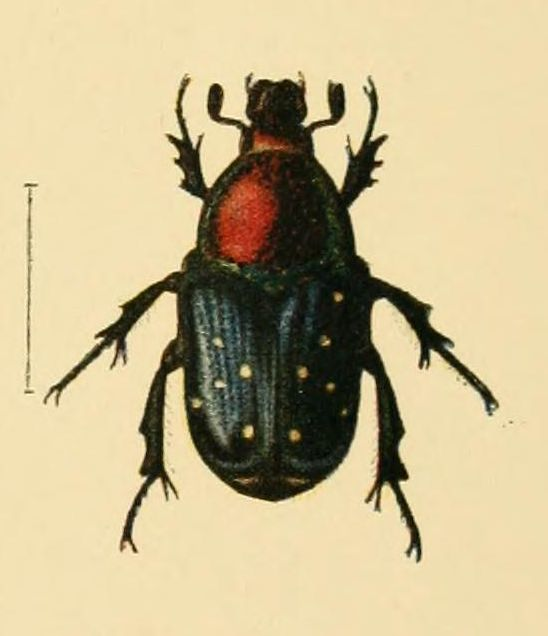
Clinteria coerulea

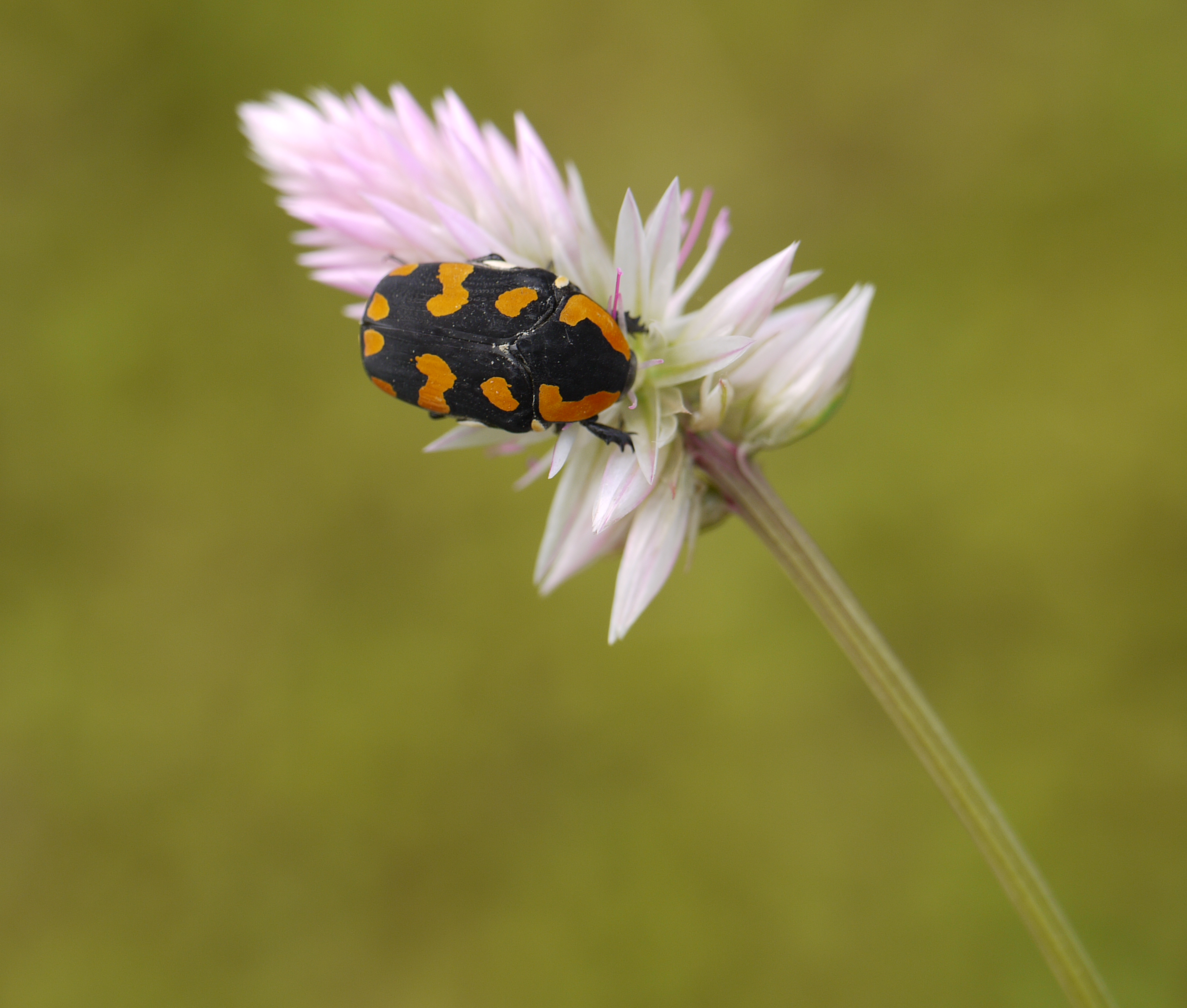
Clinteria klugii

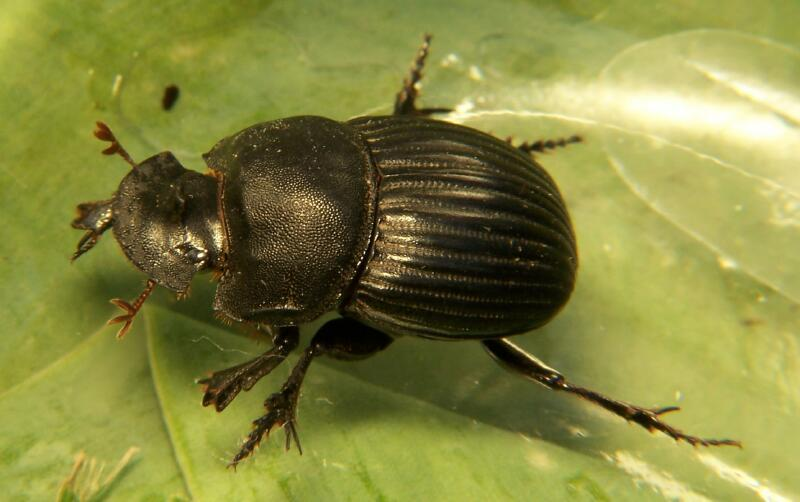
Copris fricator male

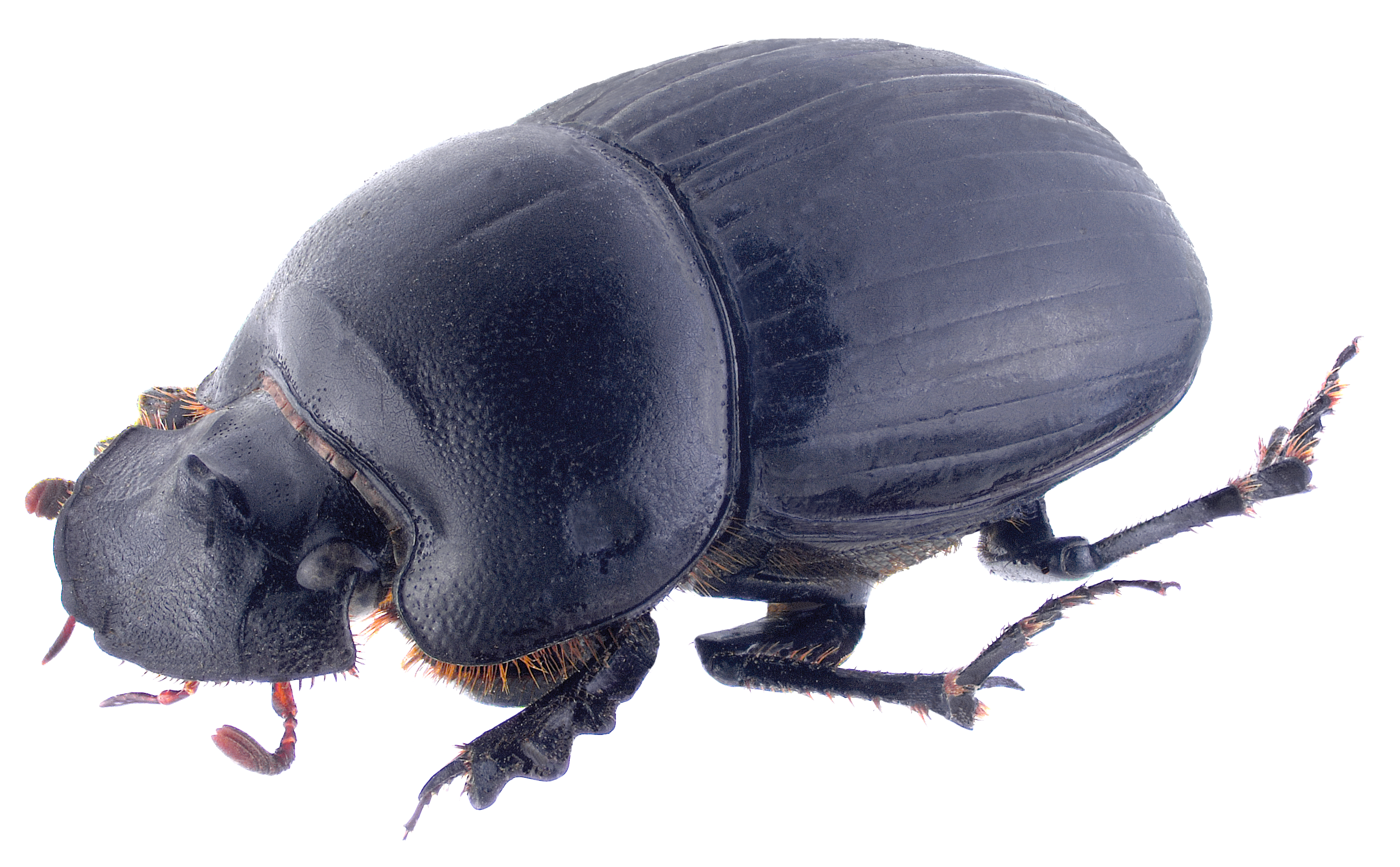
Copris repertus female

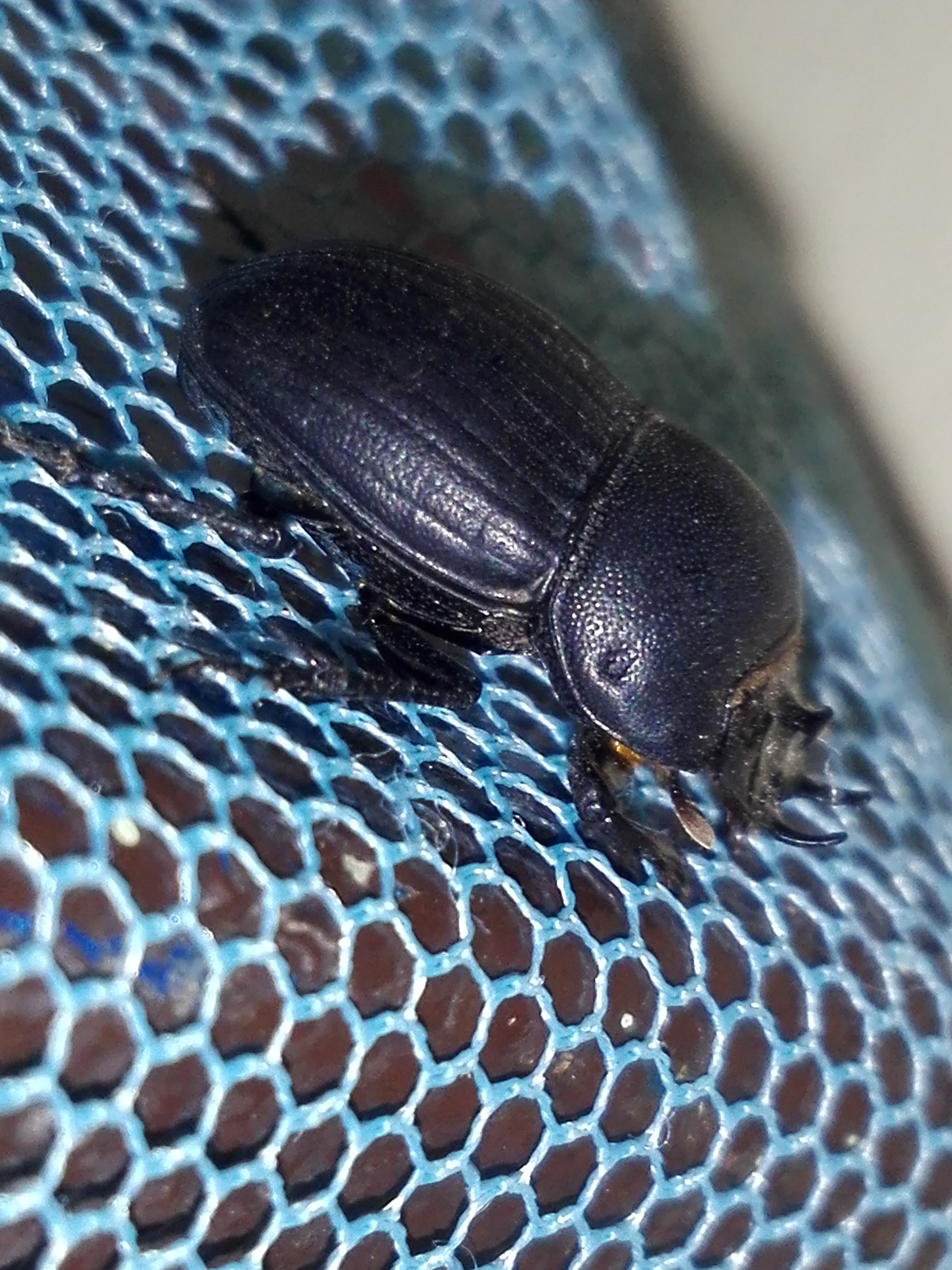
Copris signatus male

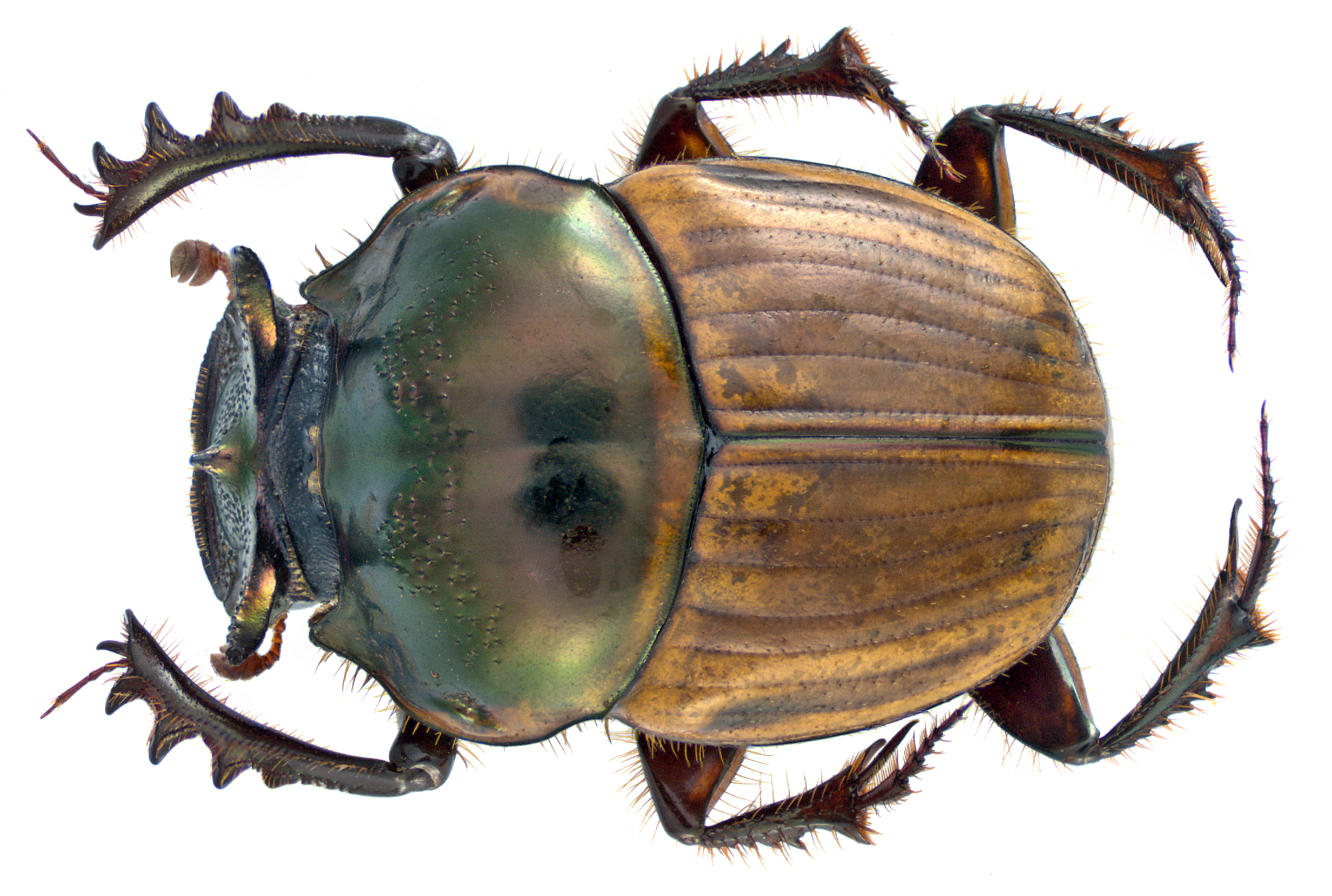
Onthophagus bonasus male

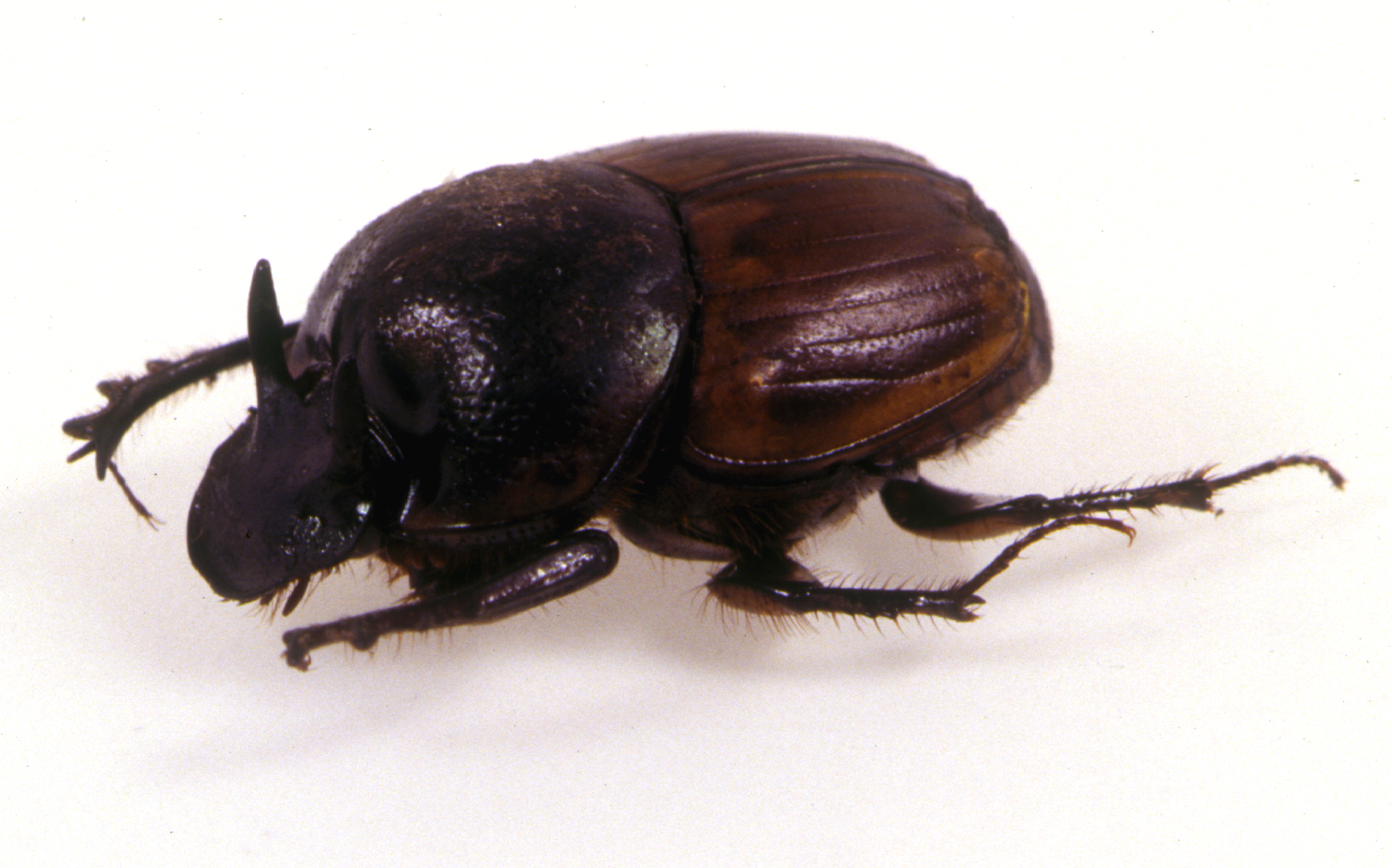
Onthophagus gazella male

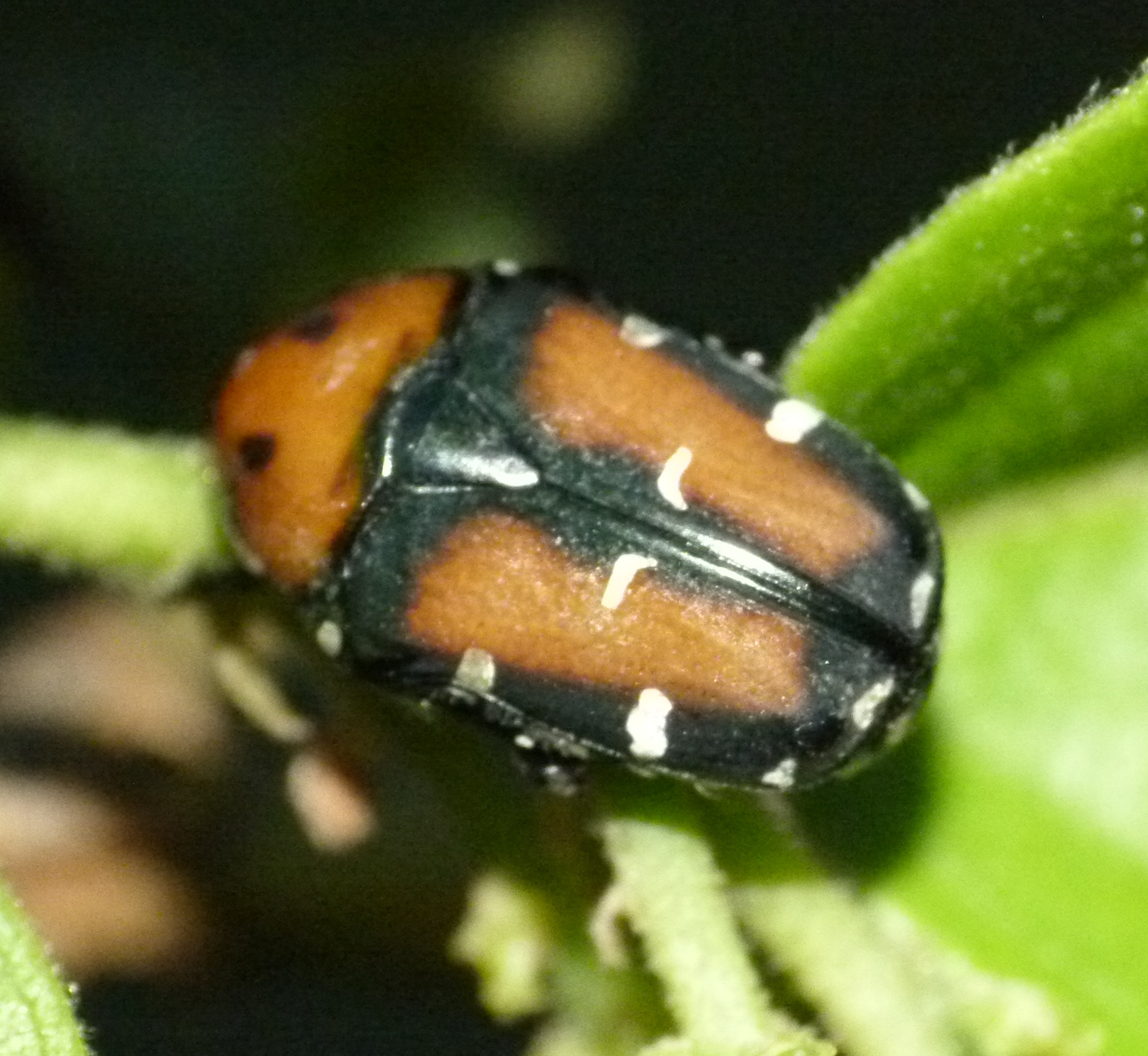
Gametis versicolor

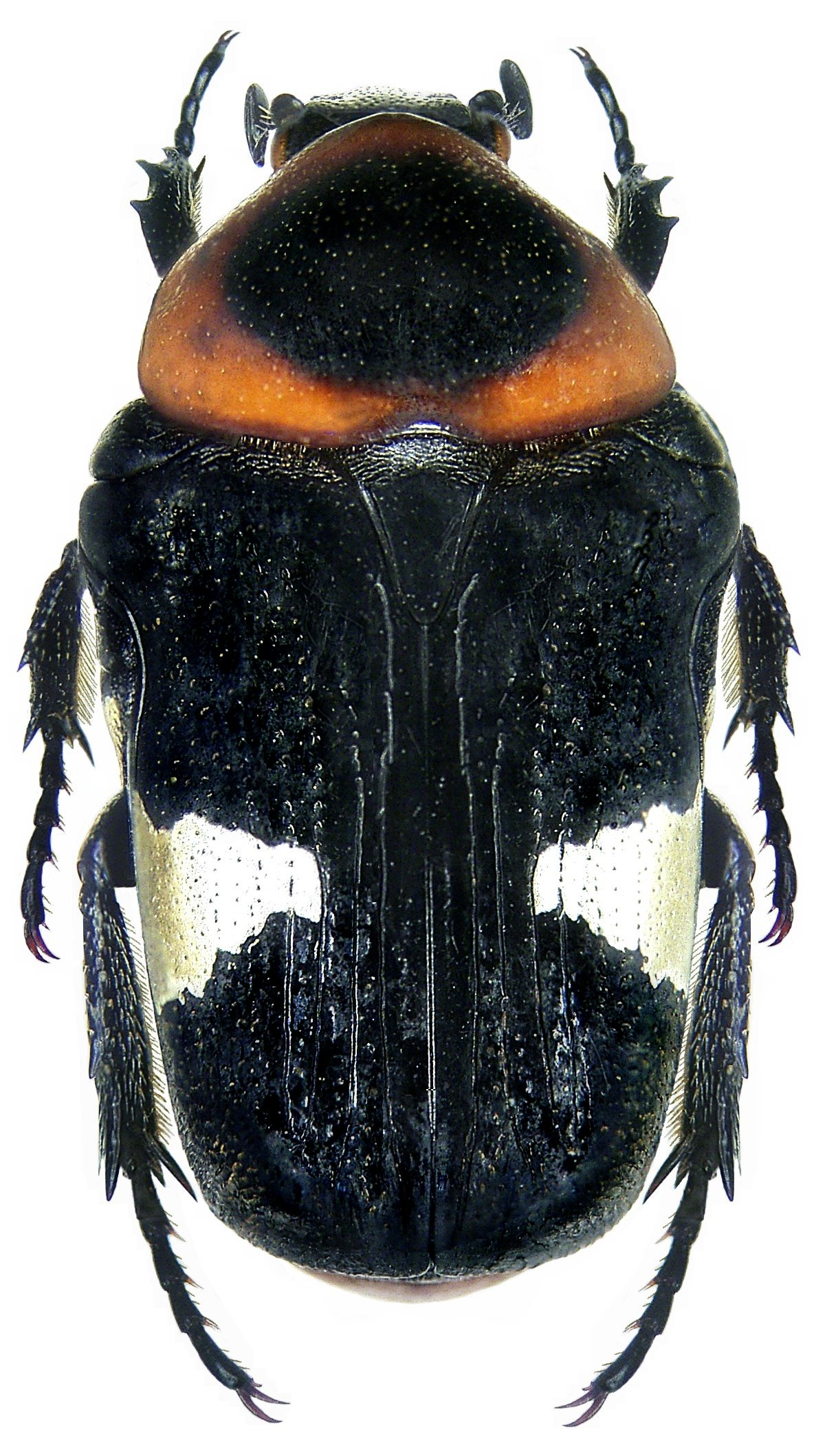
Glycyphana horsfieldi

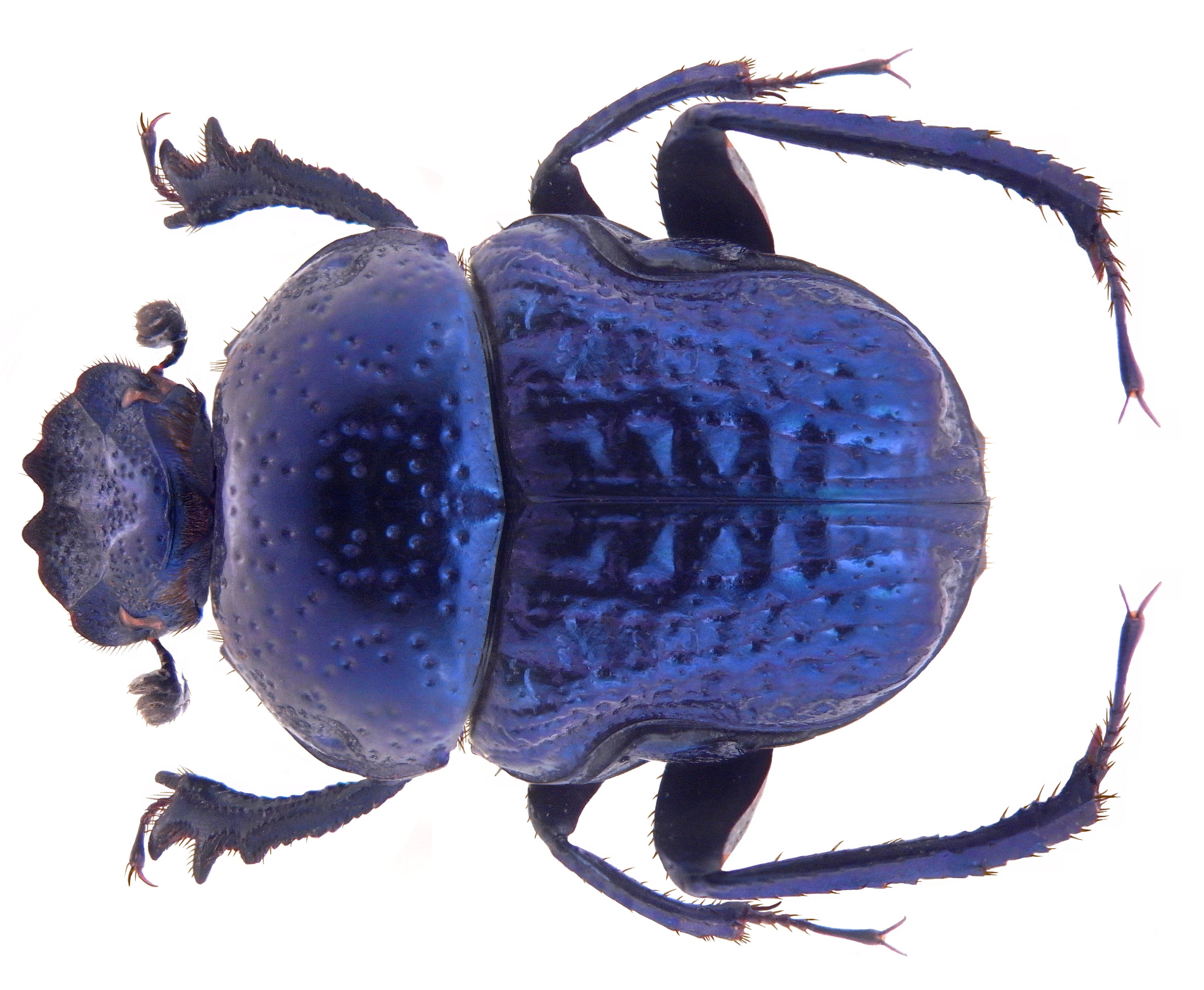
Gymnopleurus cyaneus

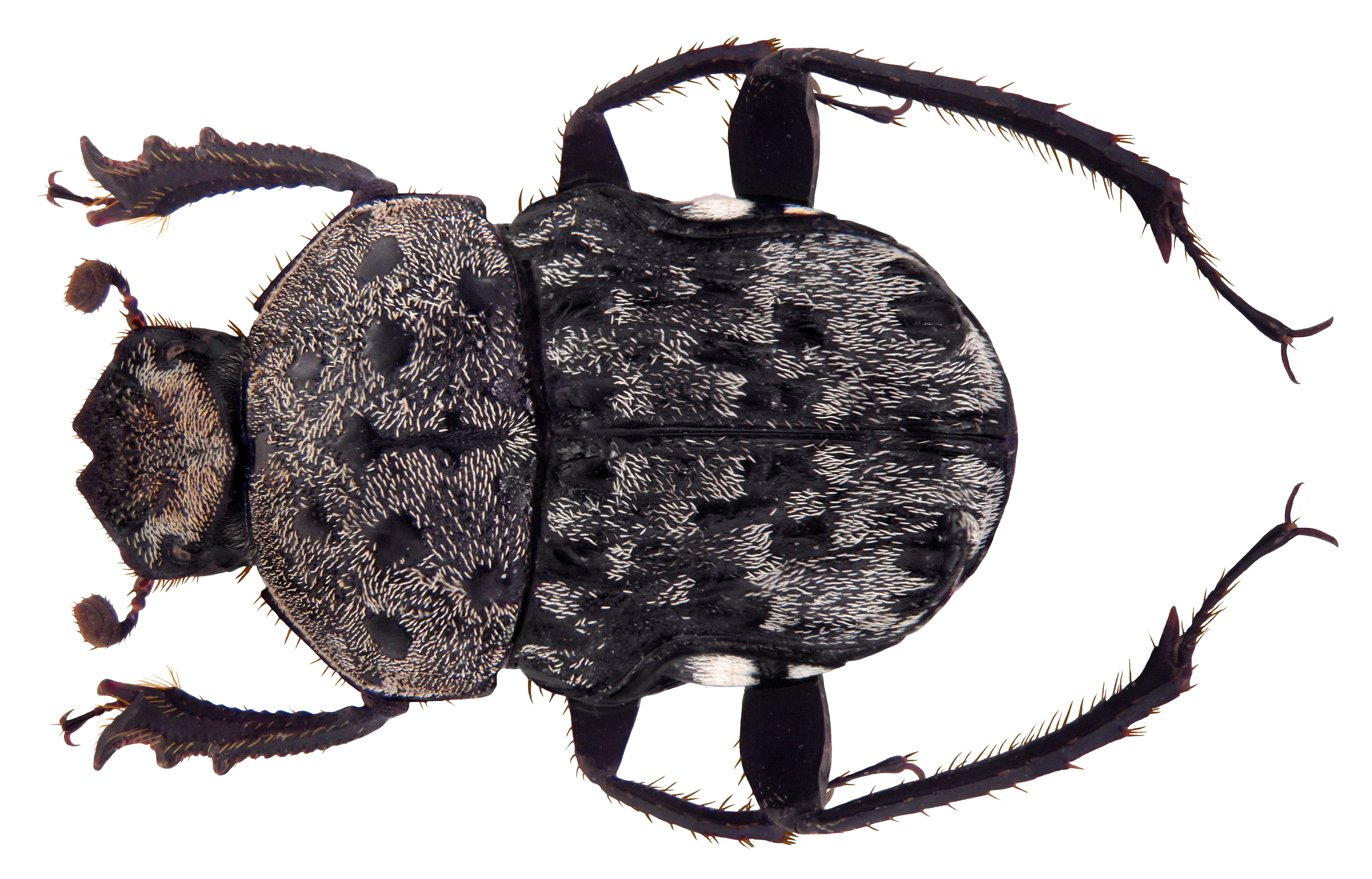
Gymnopleurus gemmatus male

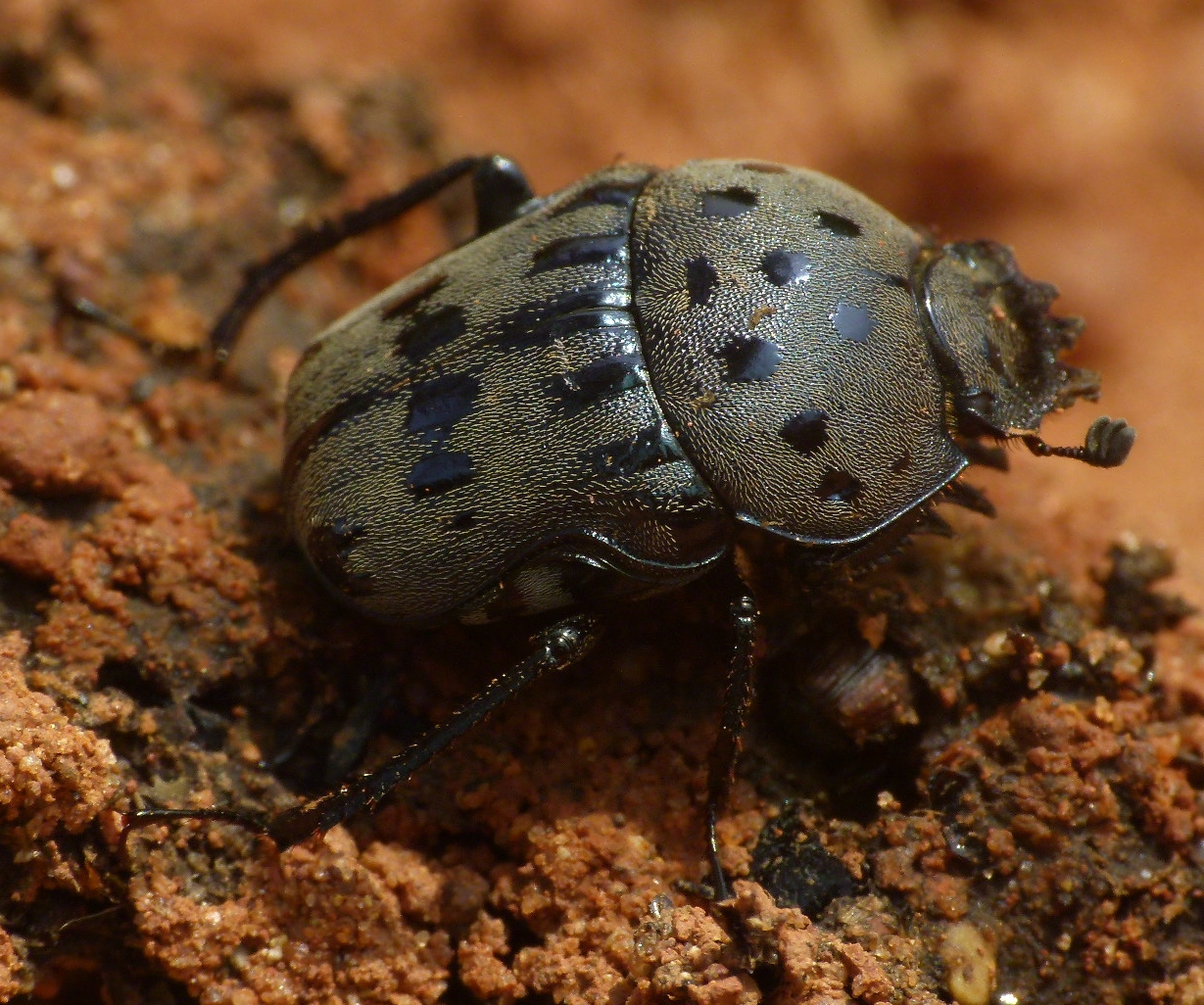
Gymnopleurus miliaris

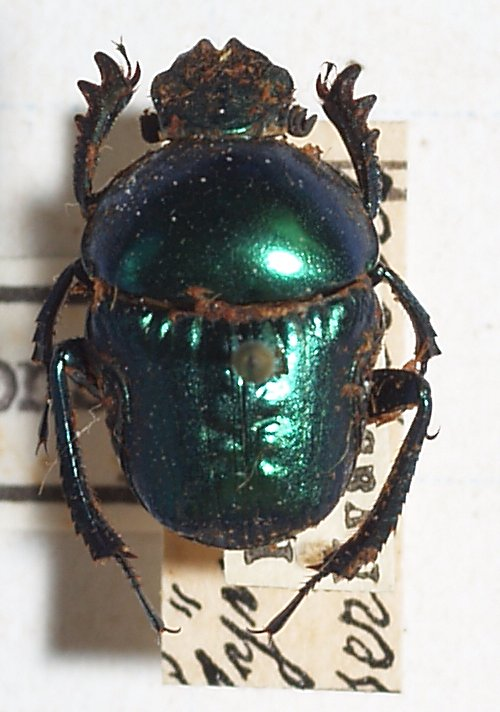
Gymnopleurus sericeifrons

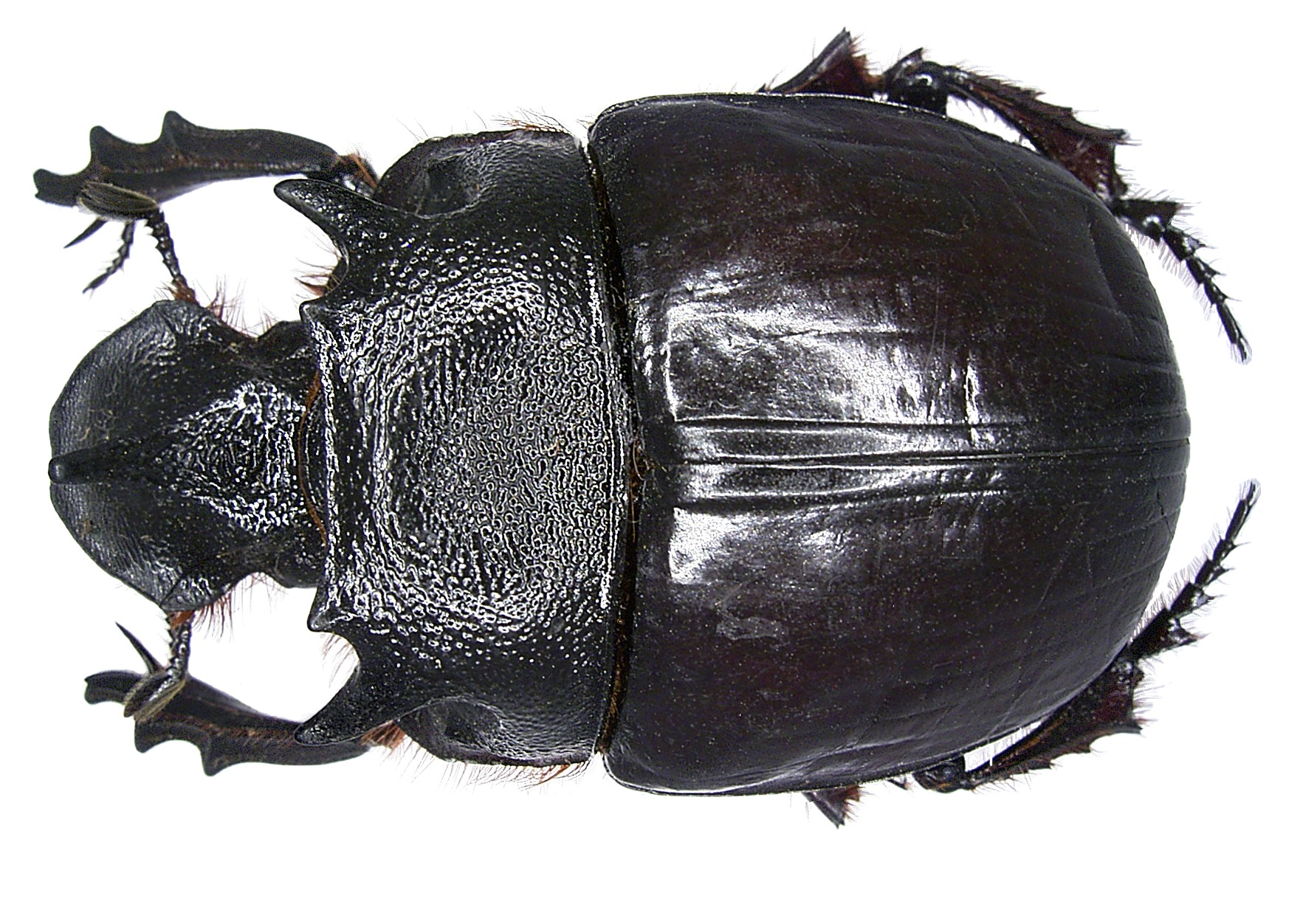
Heliocopris bucephalus

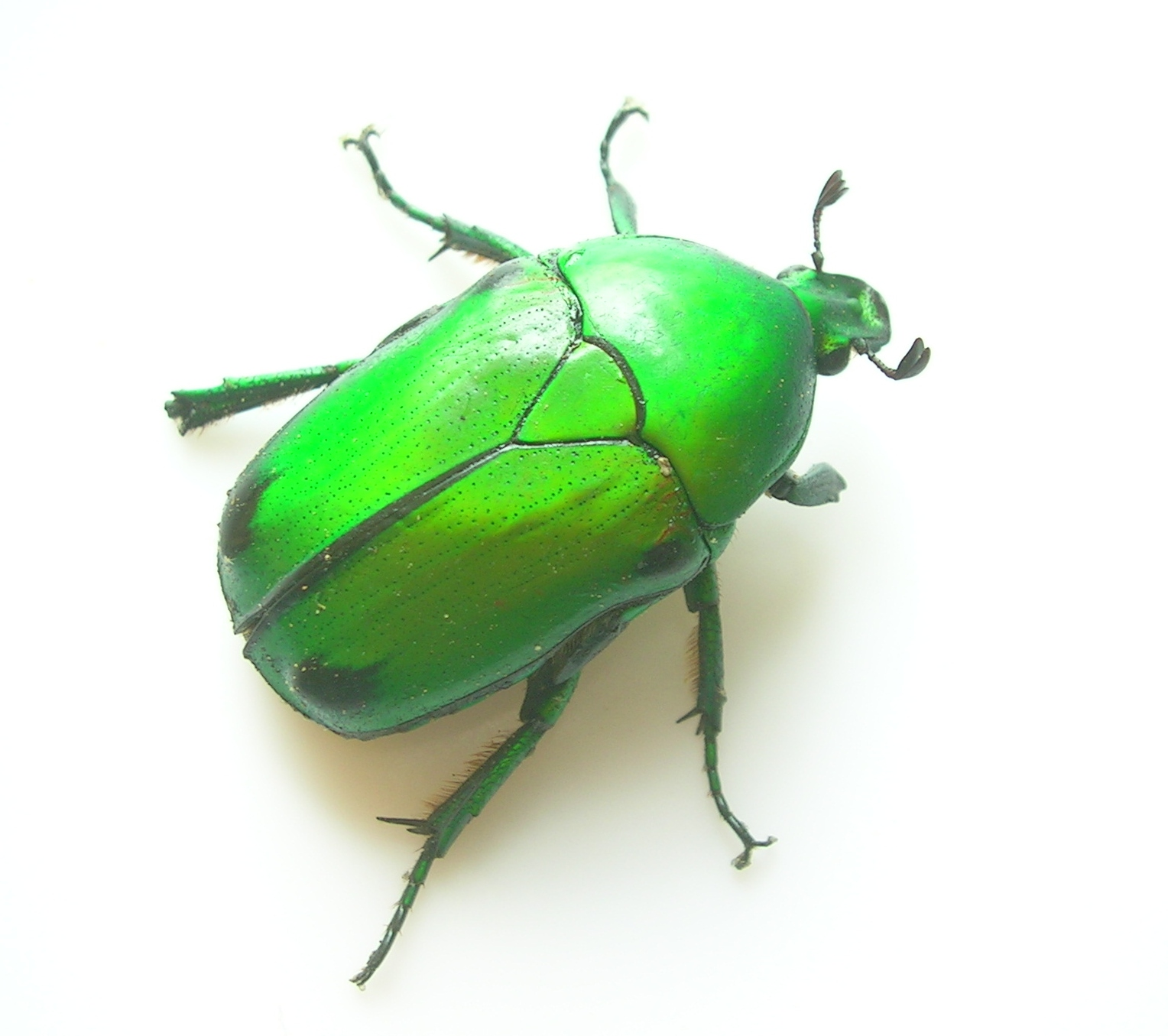
Heterorhina elegans

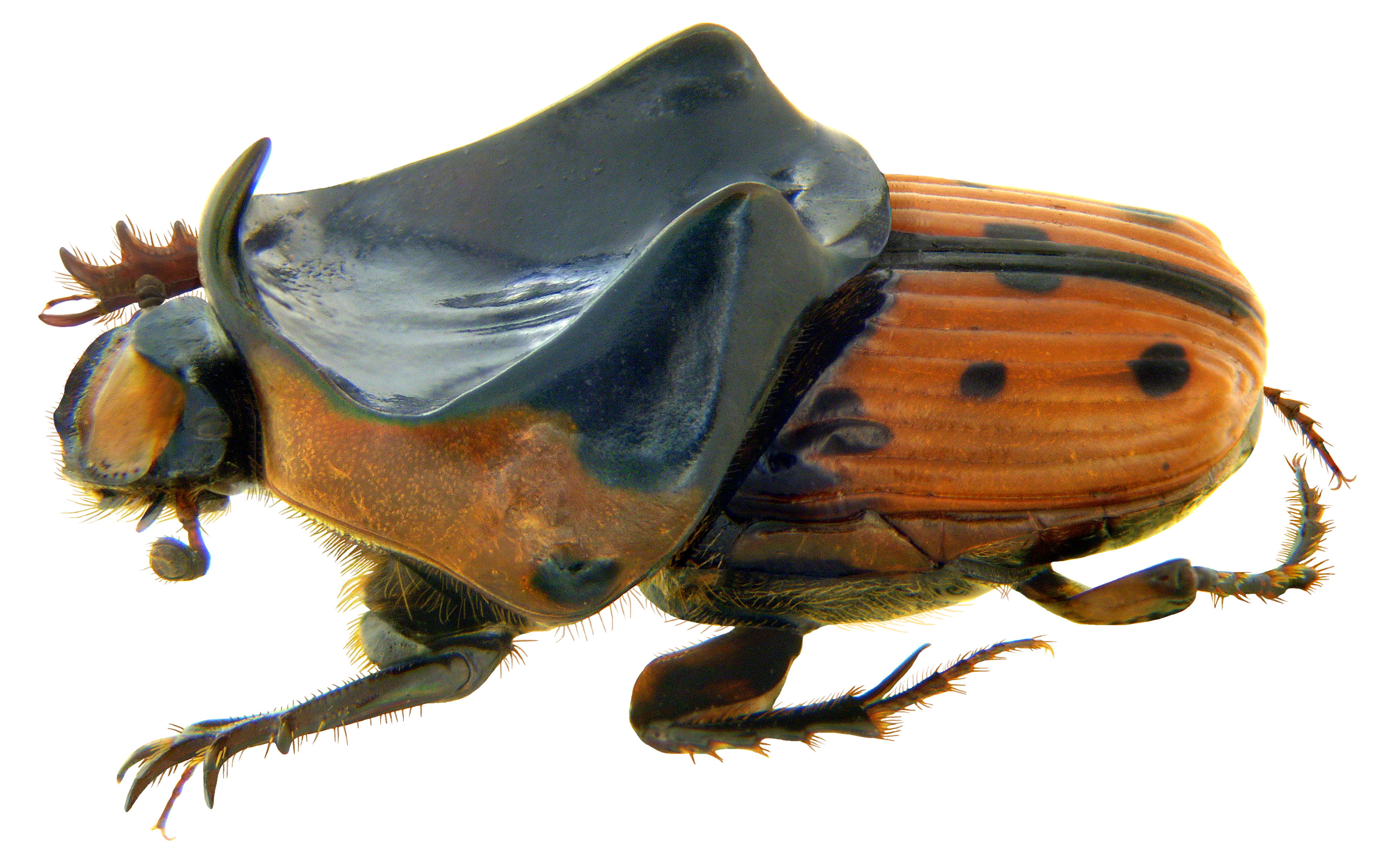
Liatongus rhadamistus

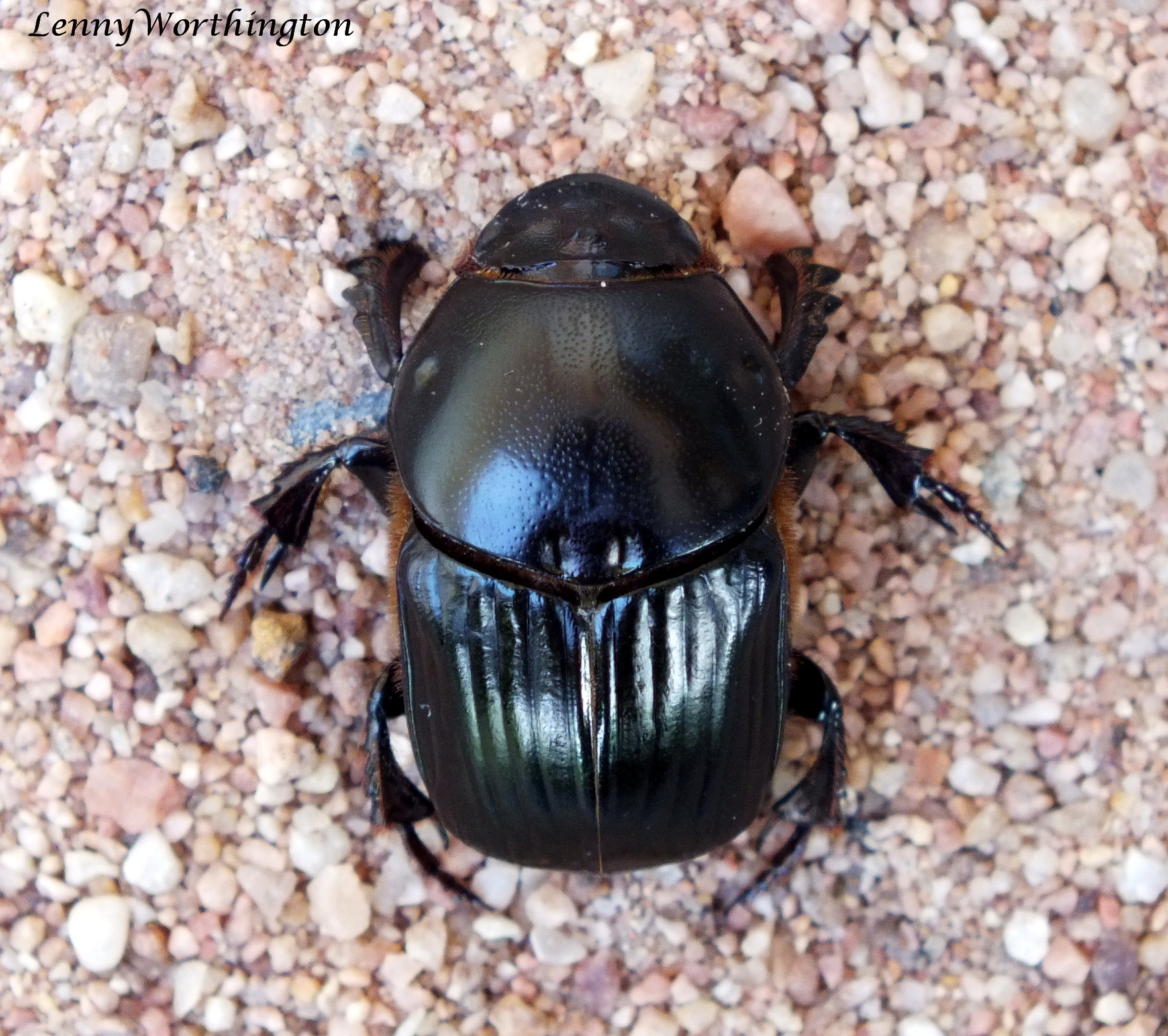
Onitis singhalensis

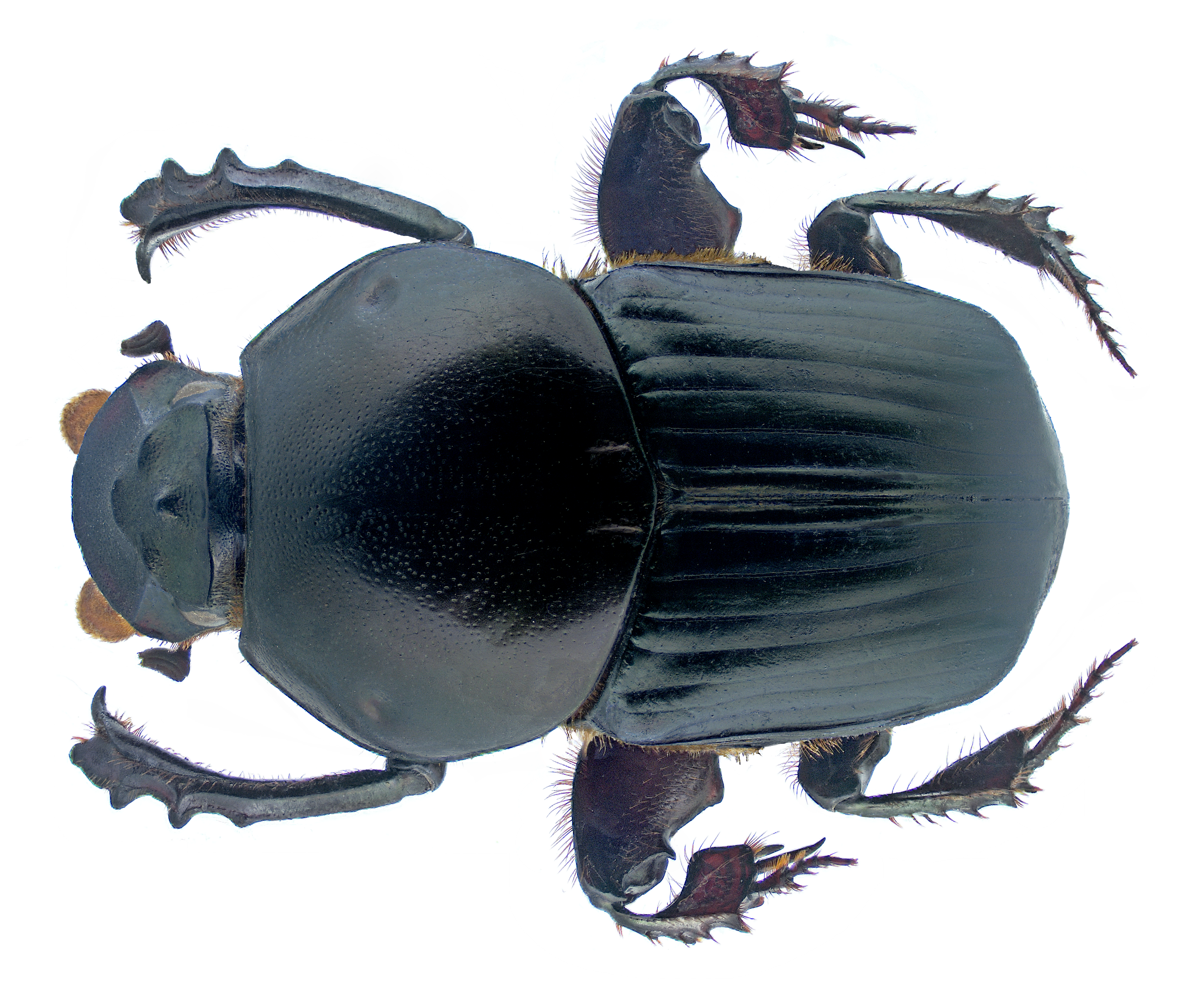
Onitis subopacus

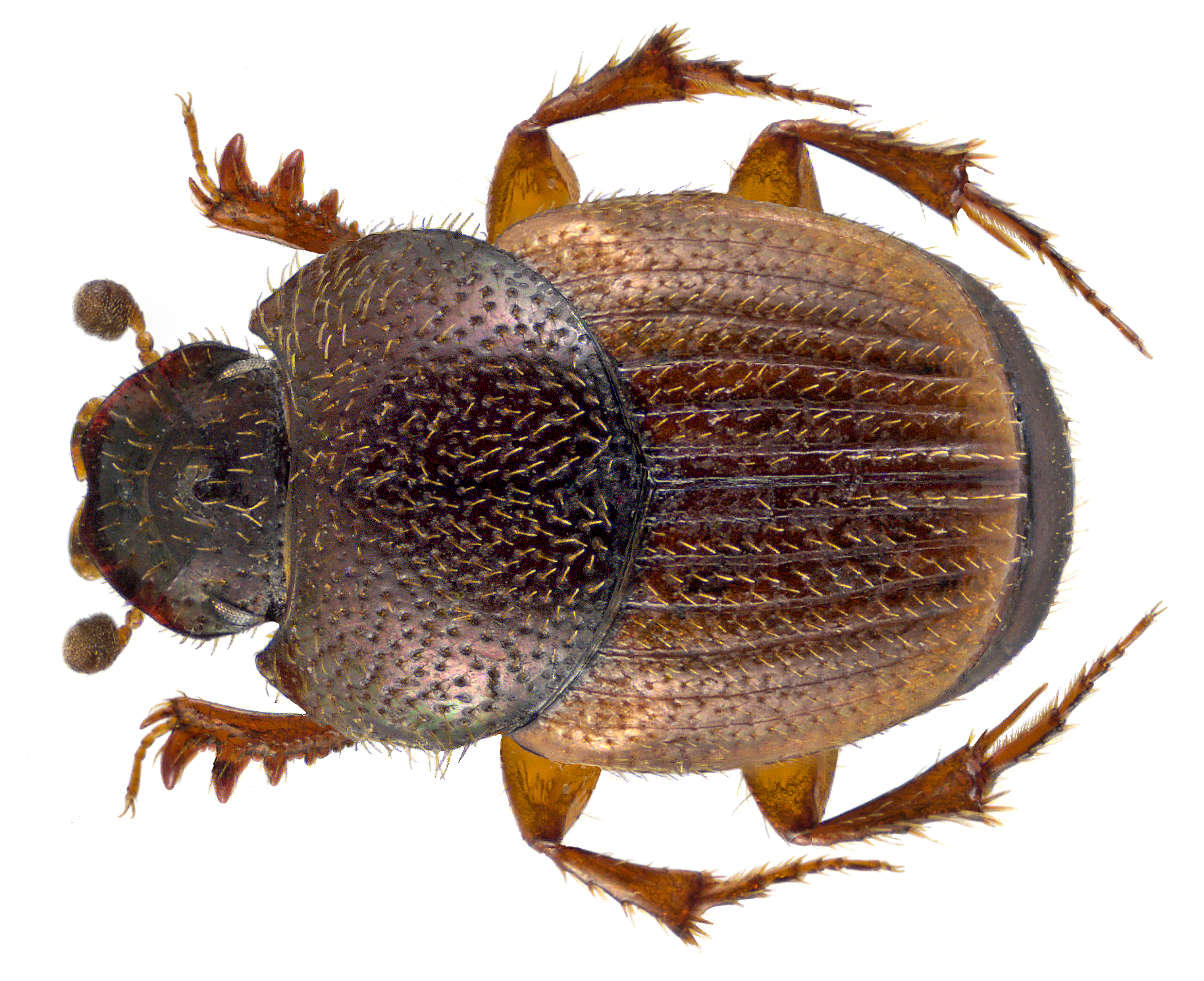
Onthophagus centricornis male

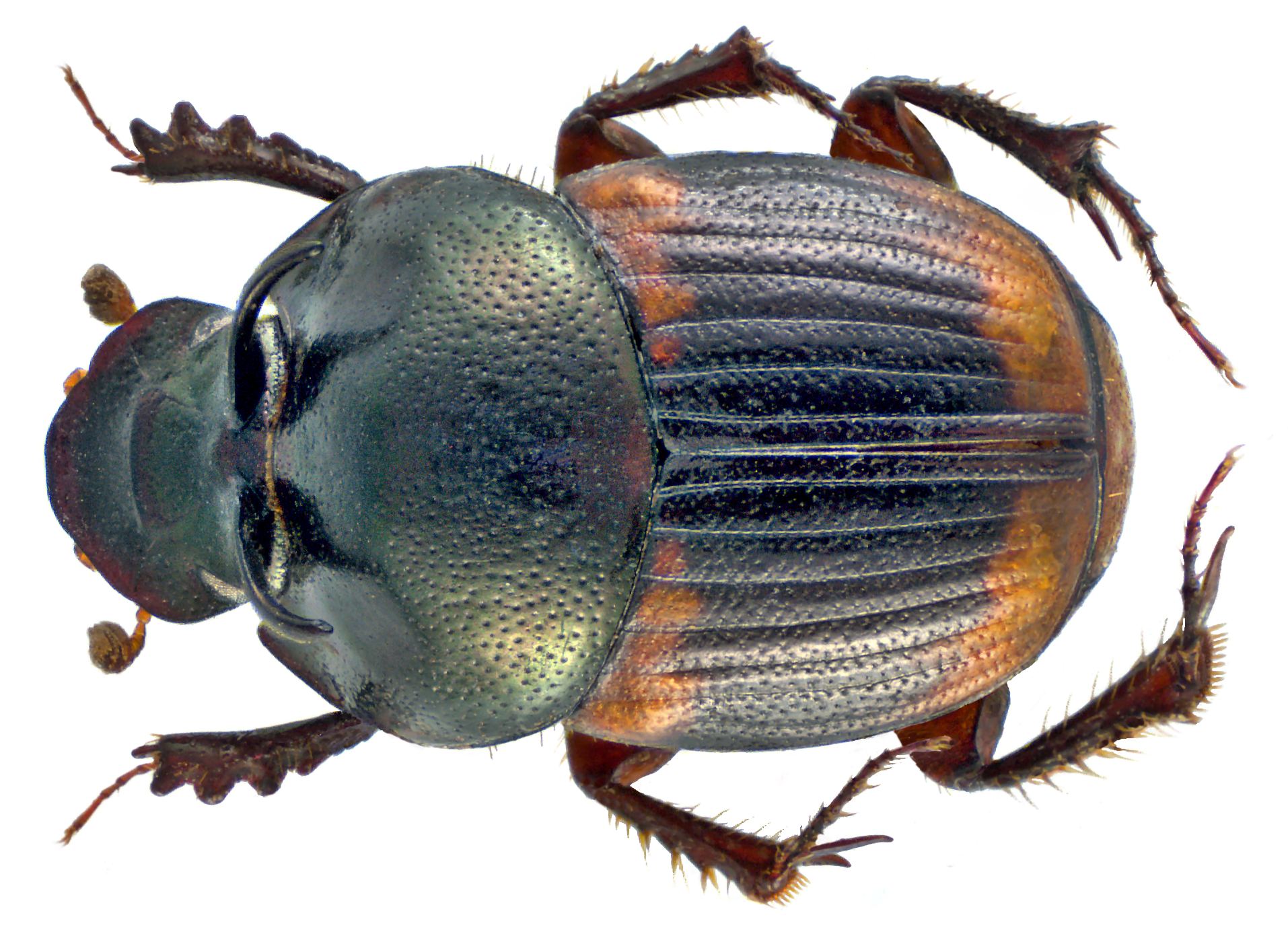
Onthophagus cervus male

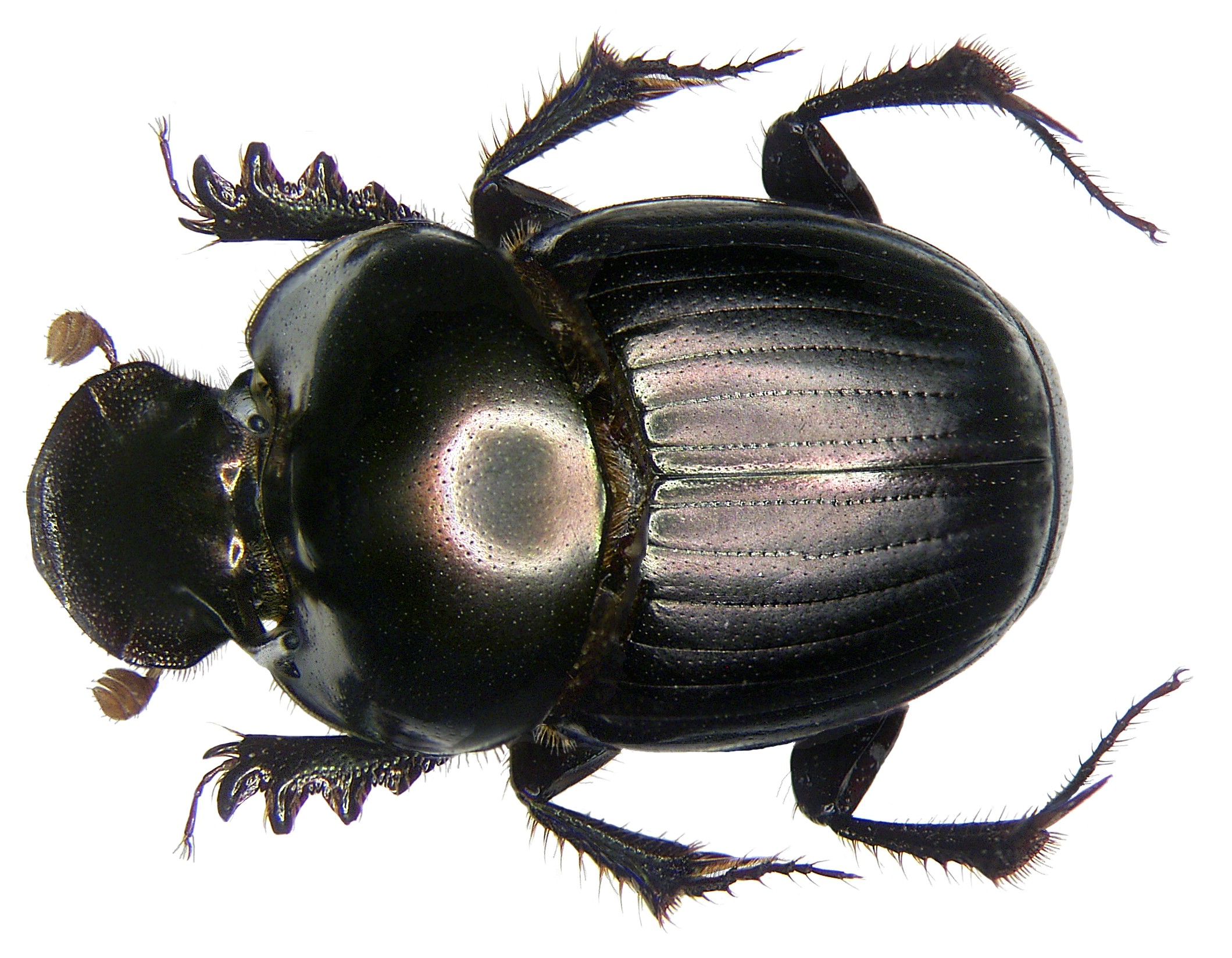
Onthophagus dama male

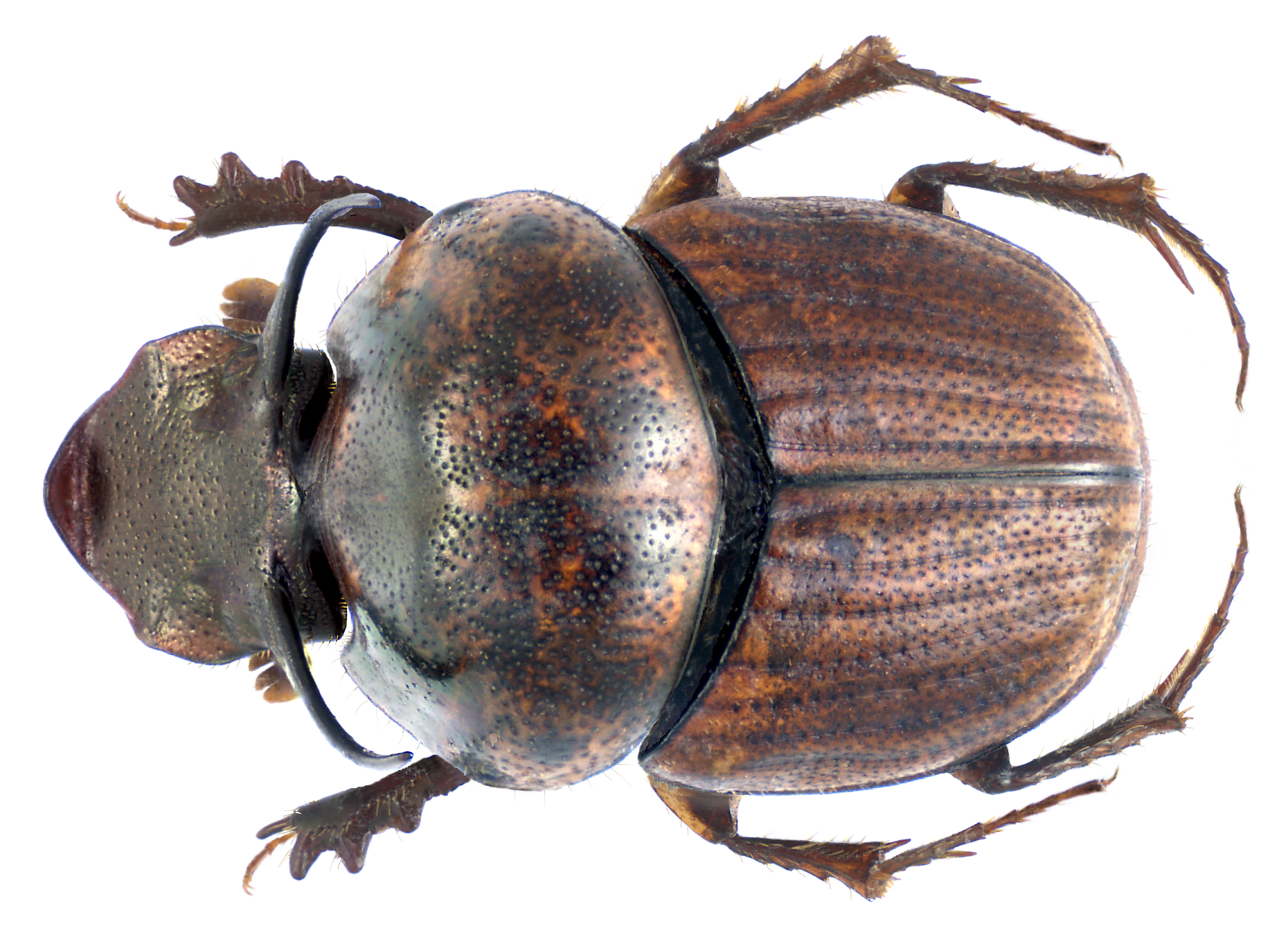
Onthophagus luridipennis male

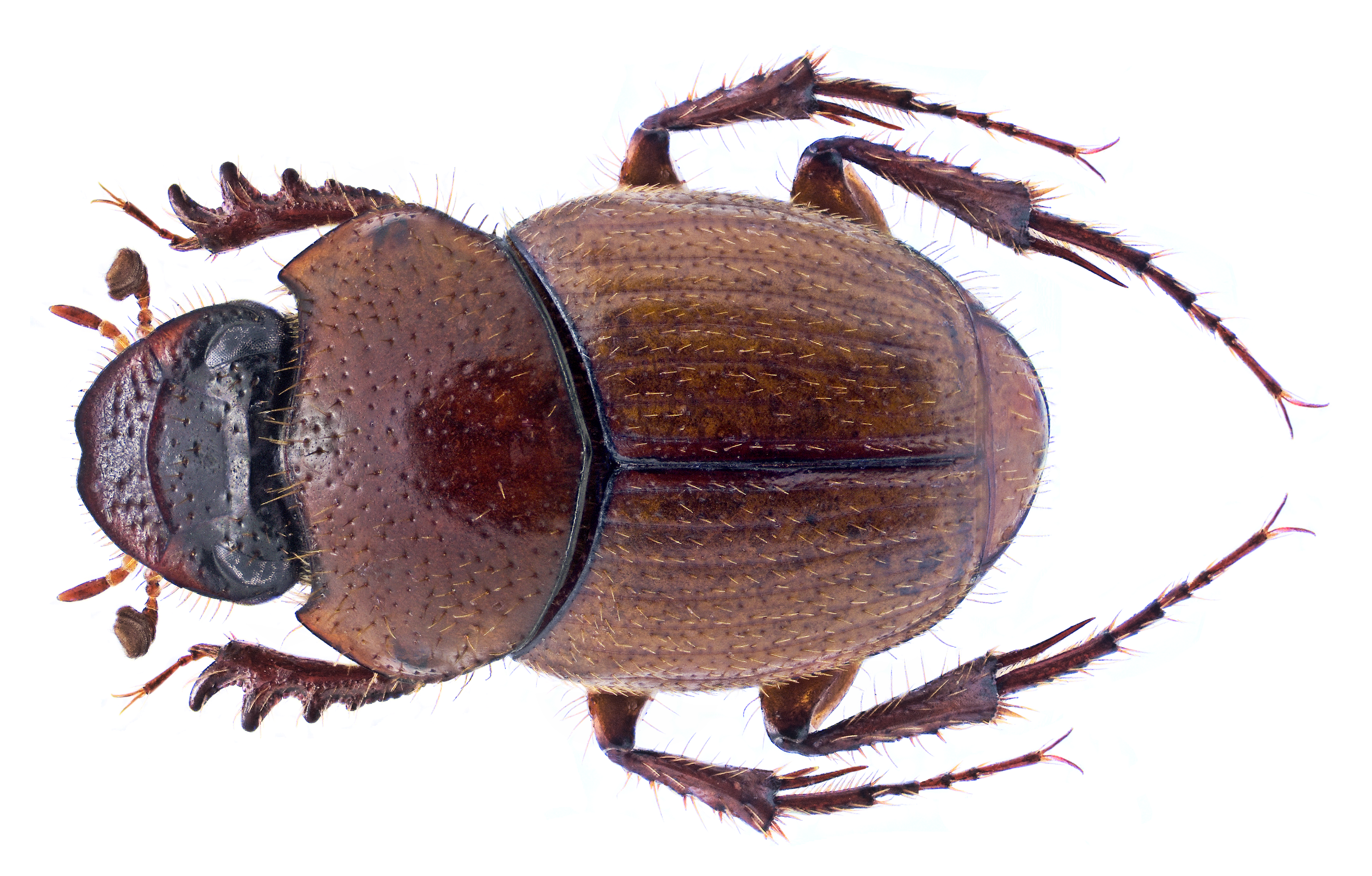
Onthophagus ochreatus

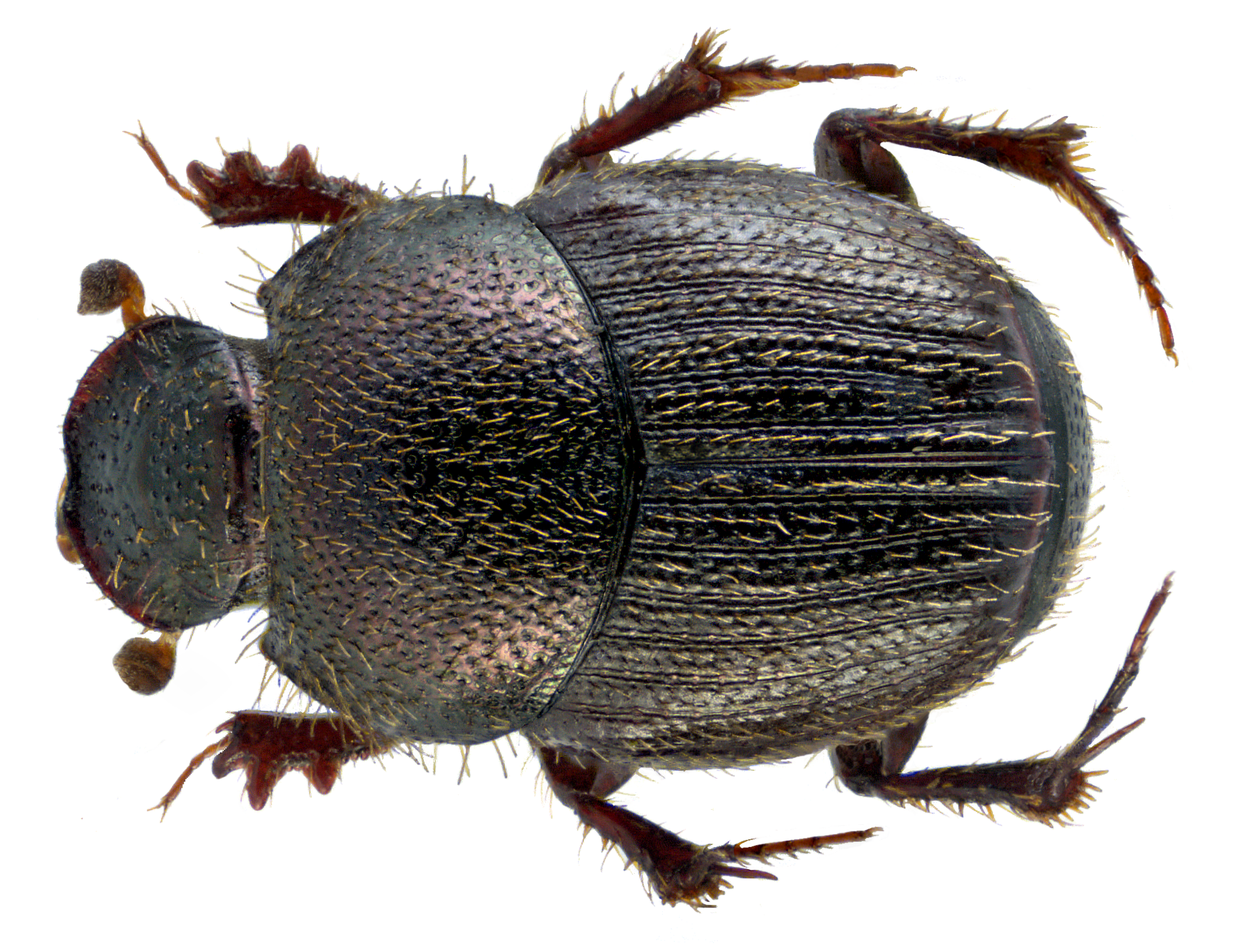
Onthophagus parvulus male

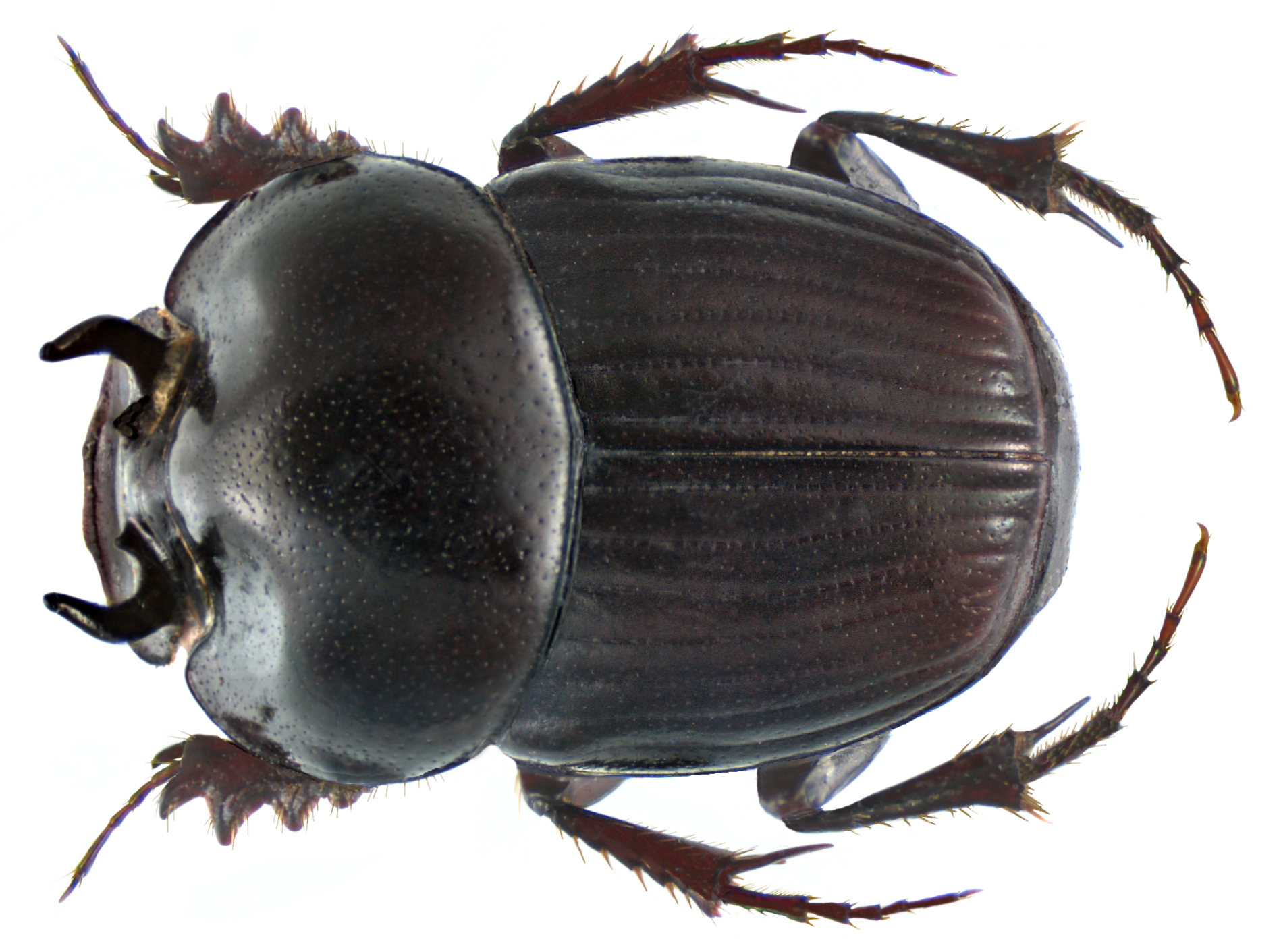
Onthophagus quadridentatus male

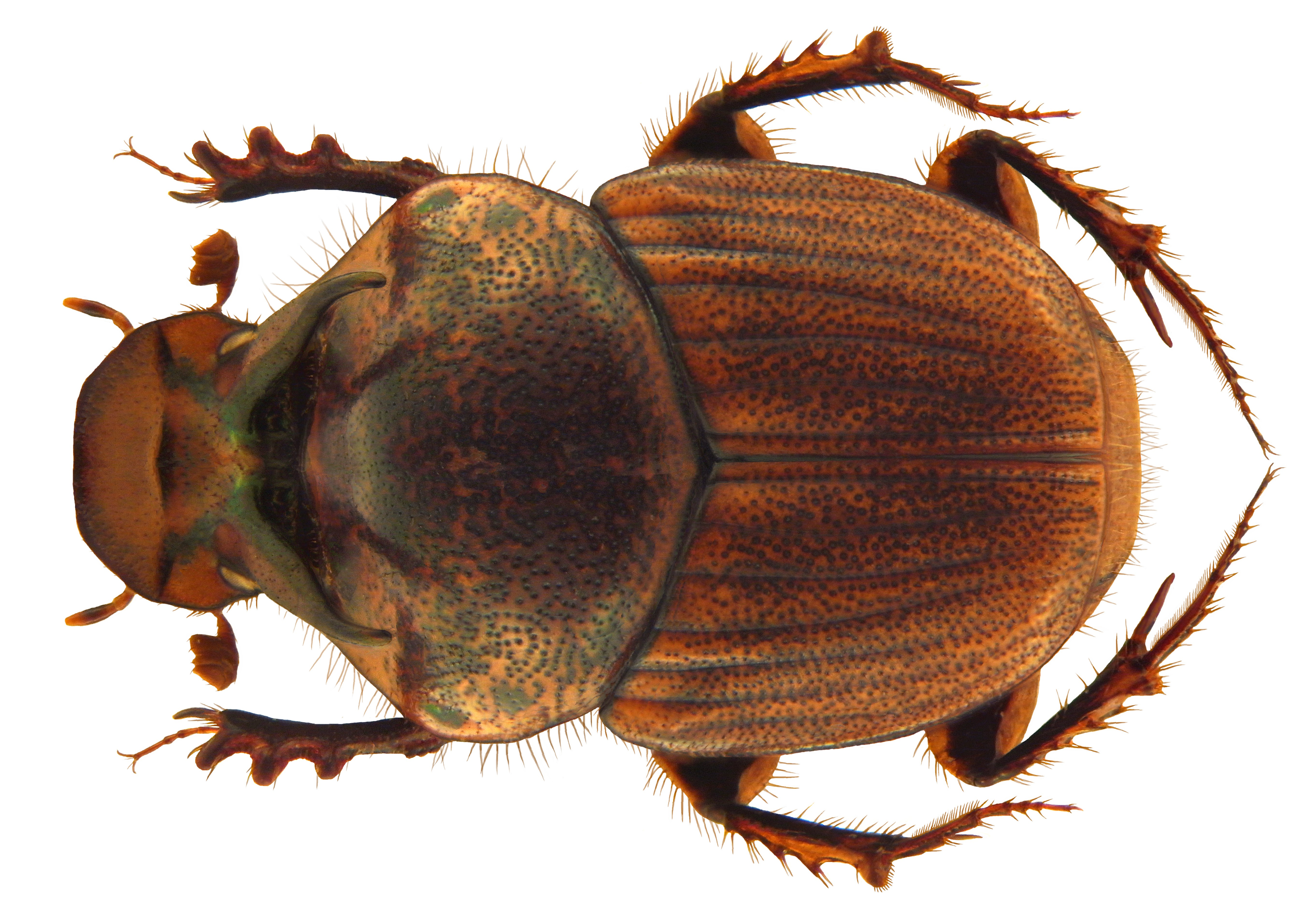
Onthophagus rectecornutus male

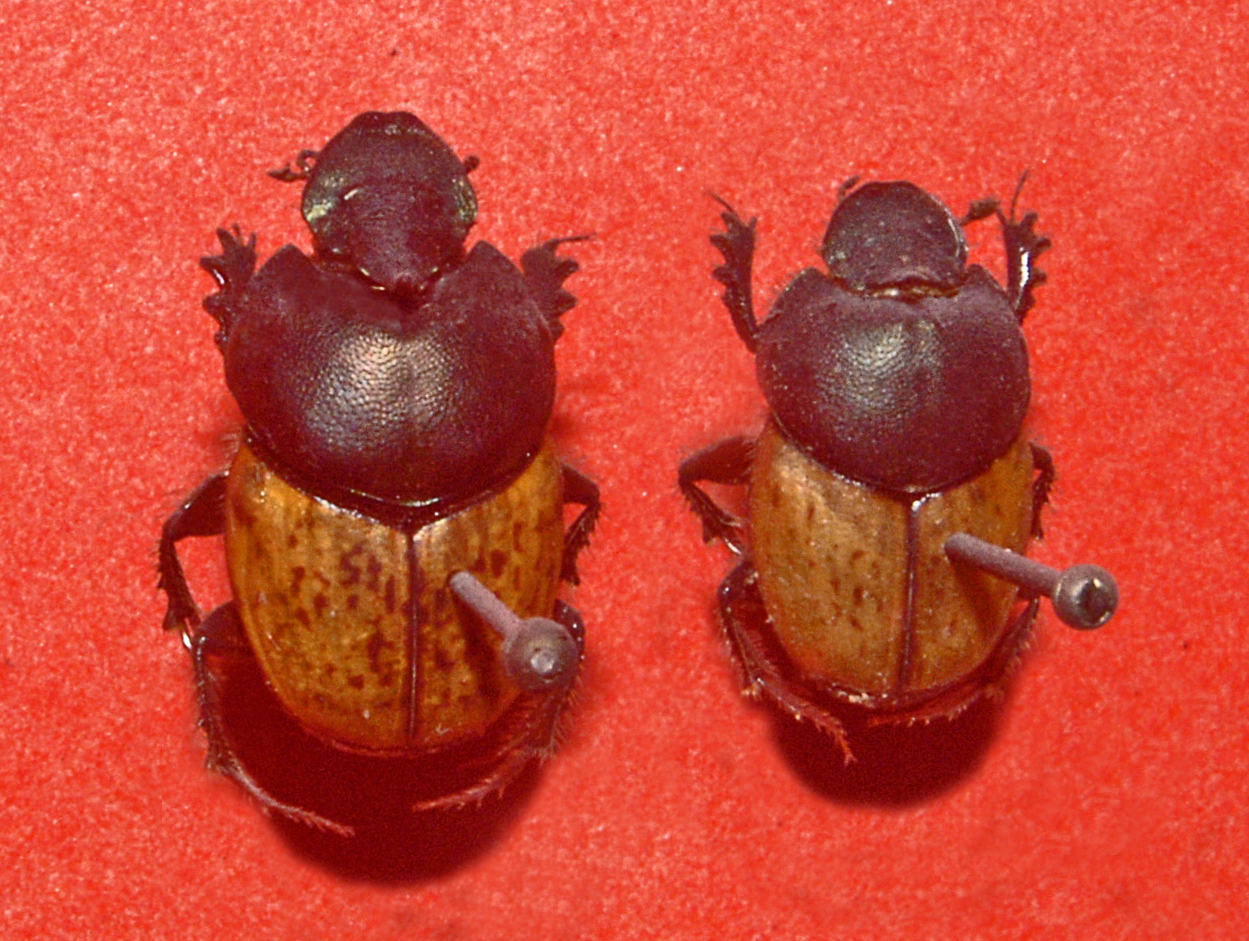
Onthophagus vacca

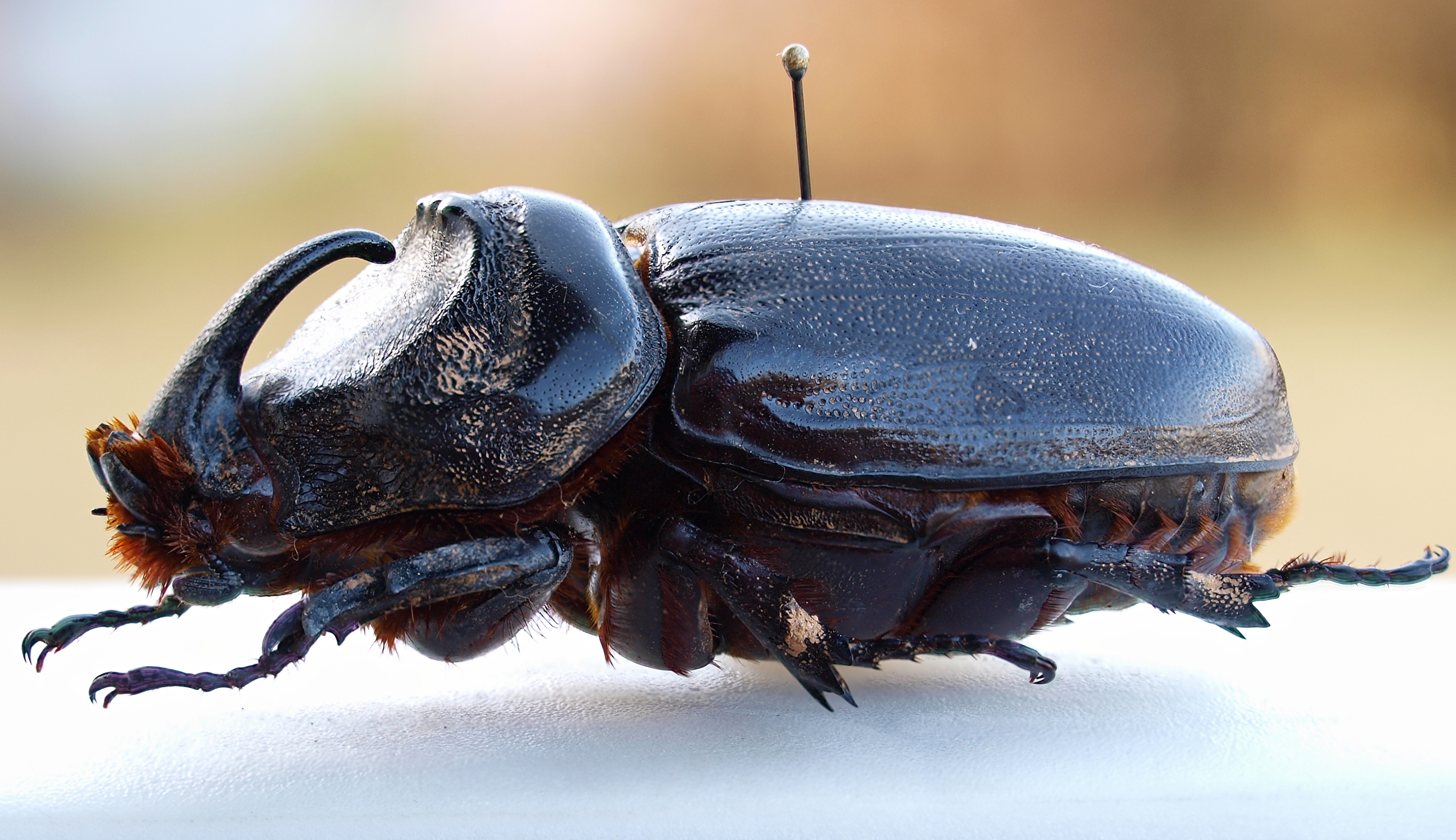
Oryctes gnu

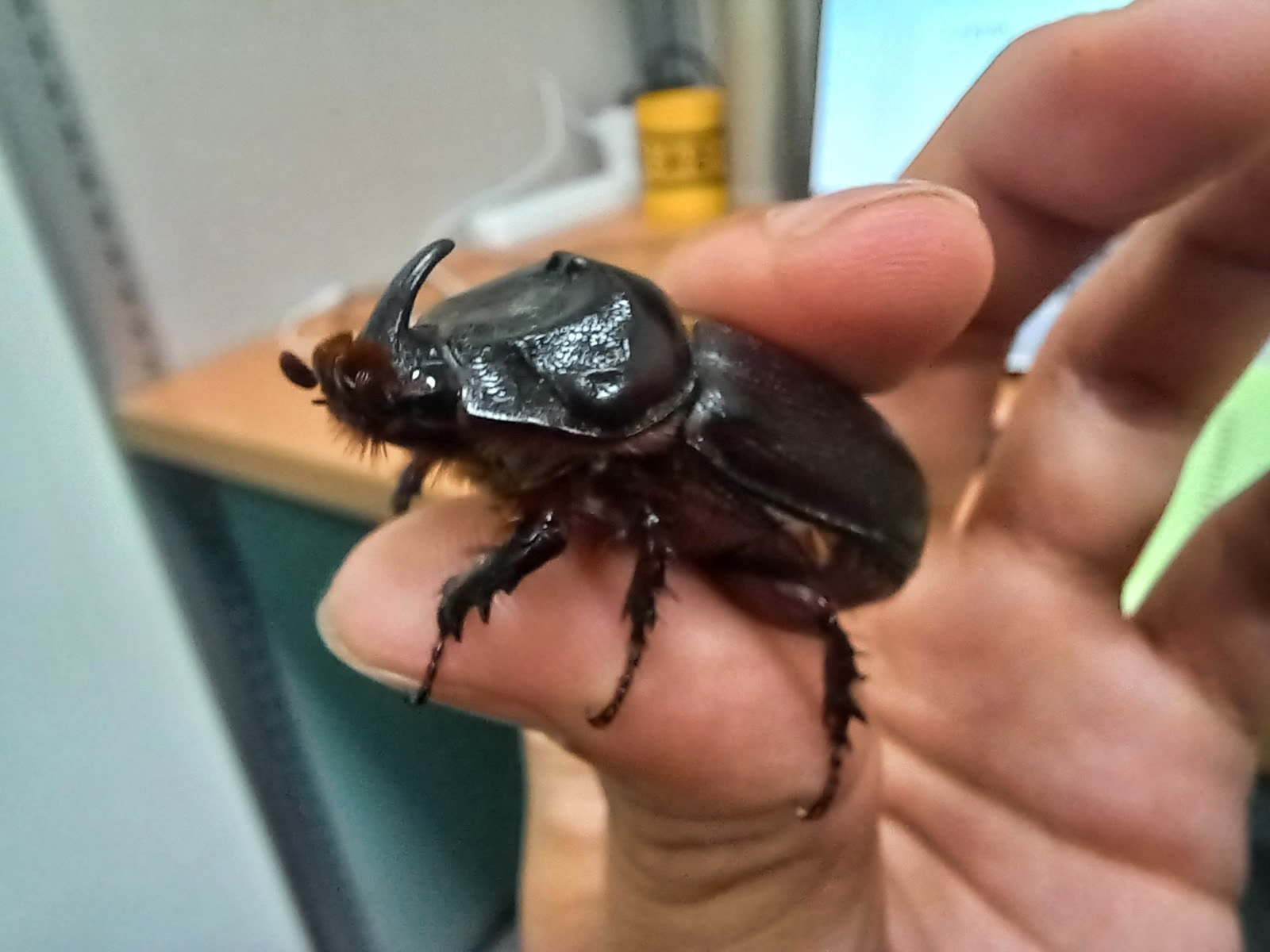
Oryctes rhinoceros male

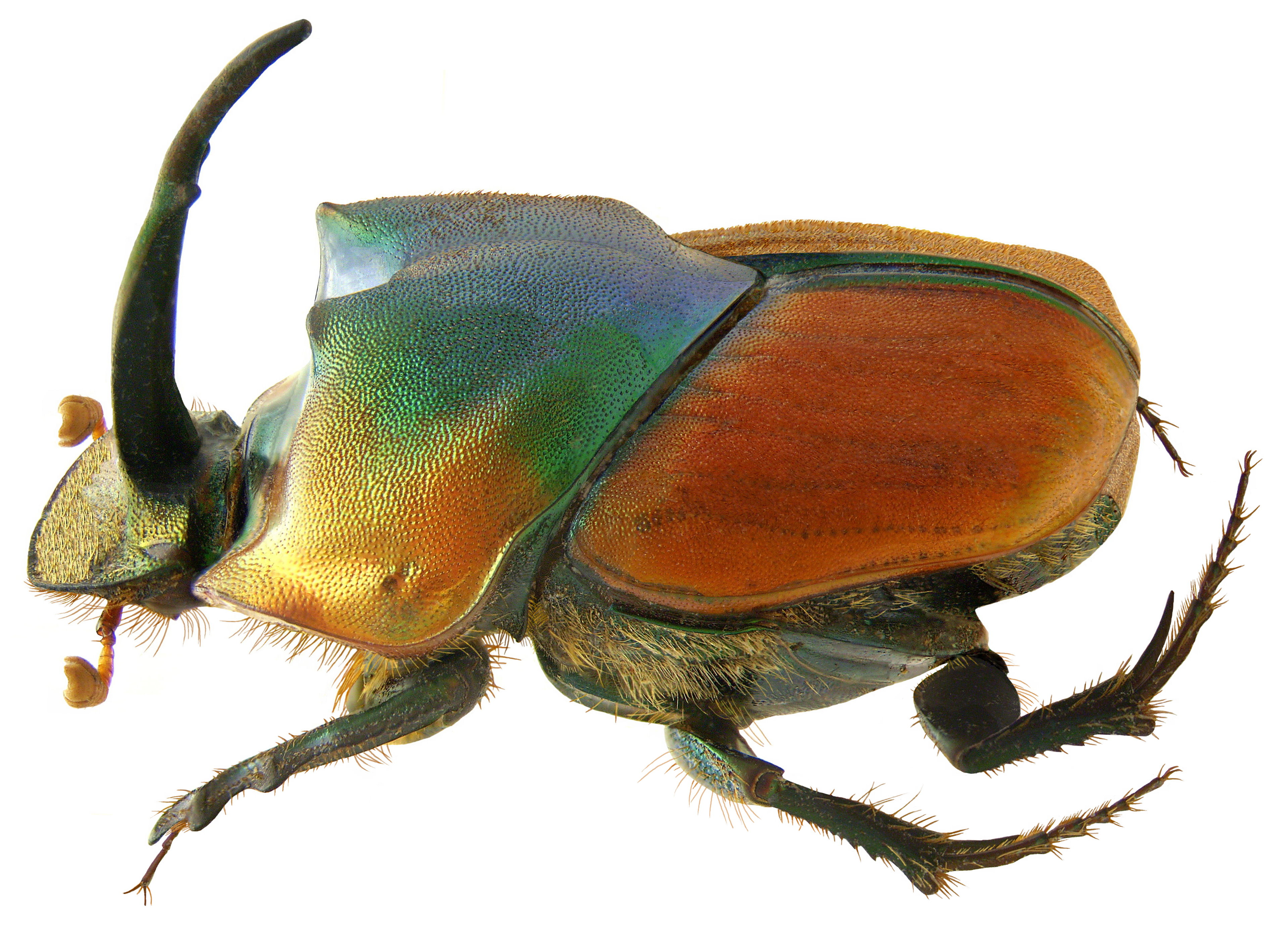
Onthophagus pactolus male

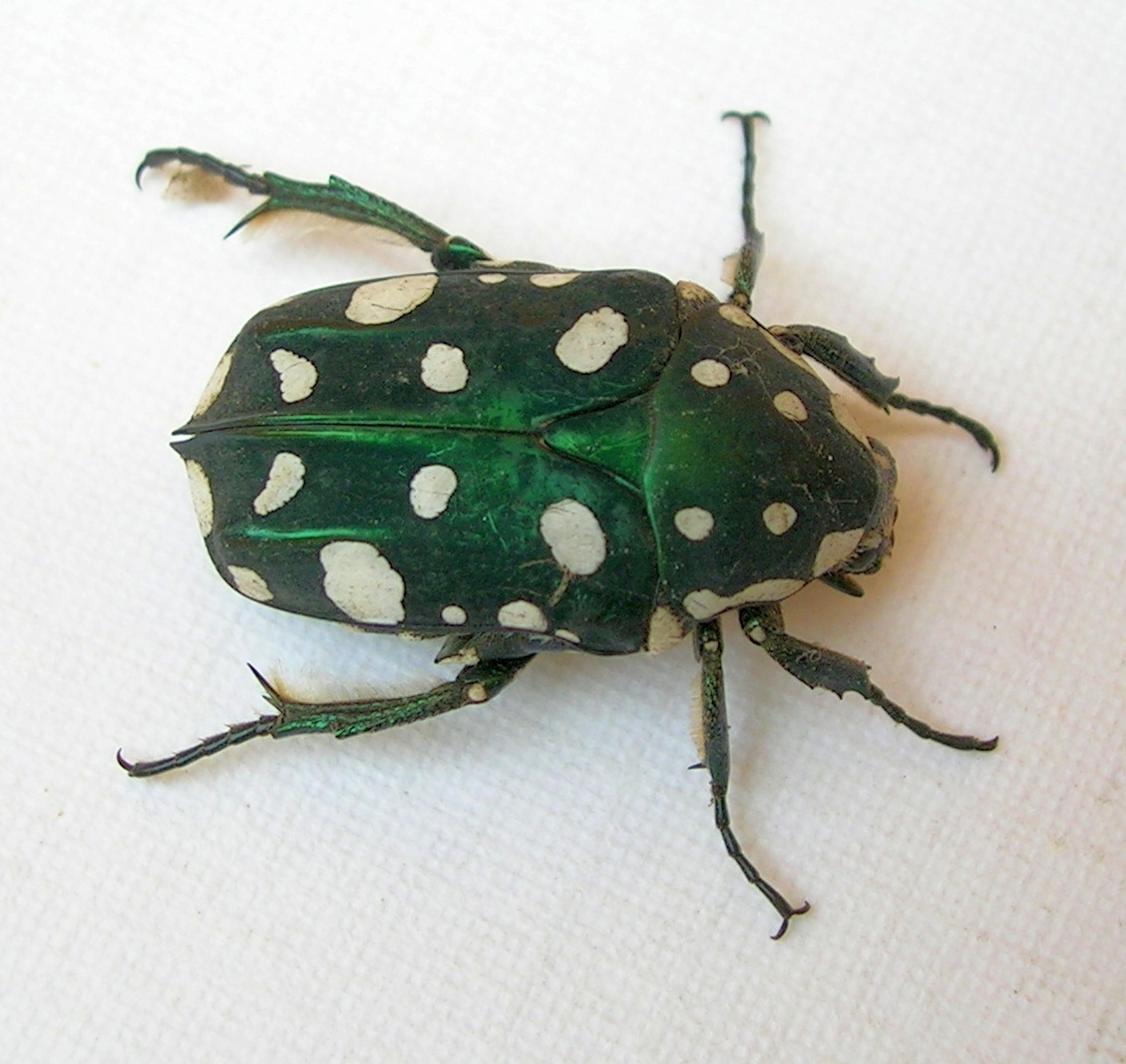
Protaetia alboguttata

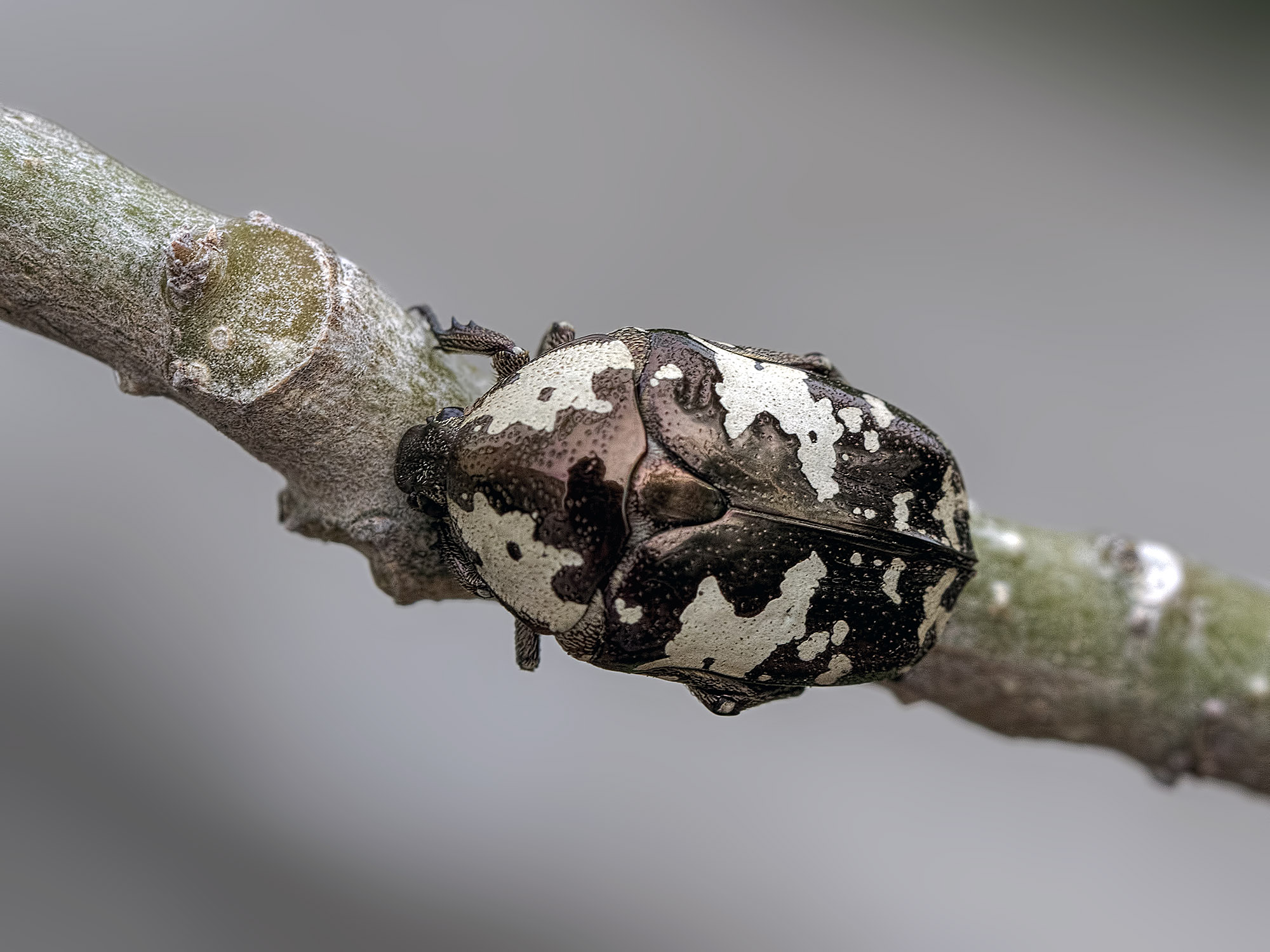
Protaetia aurichalcea

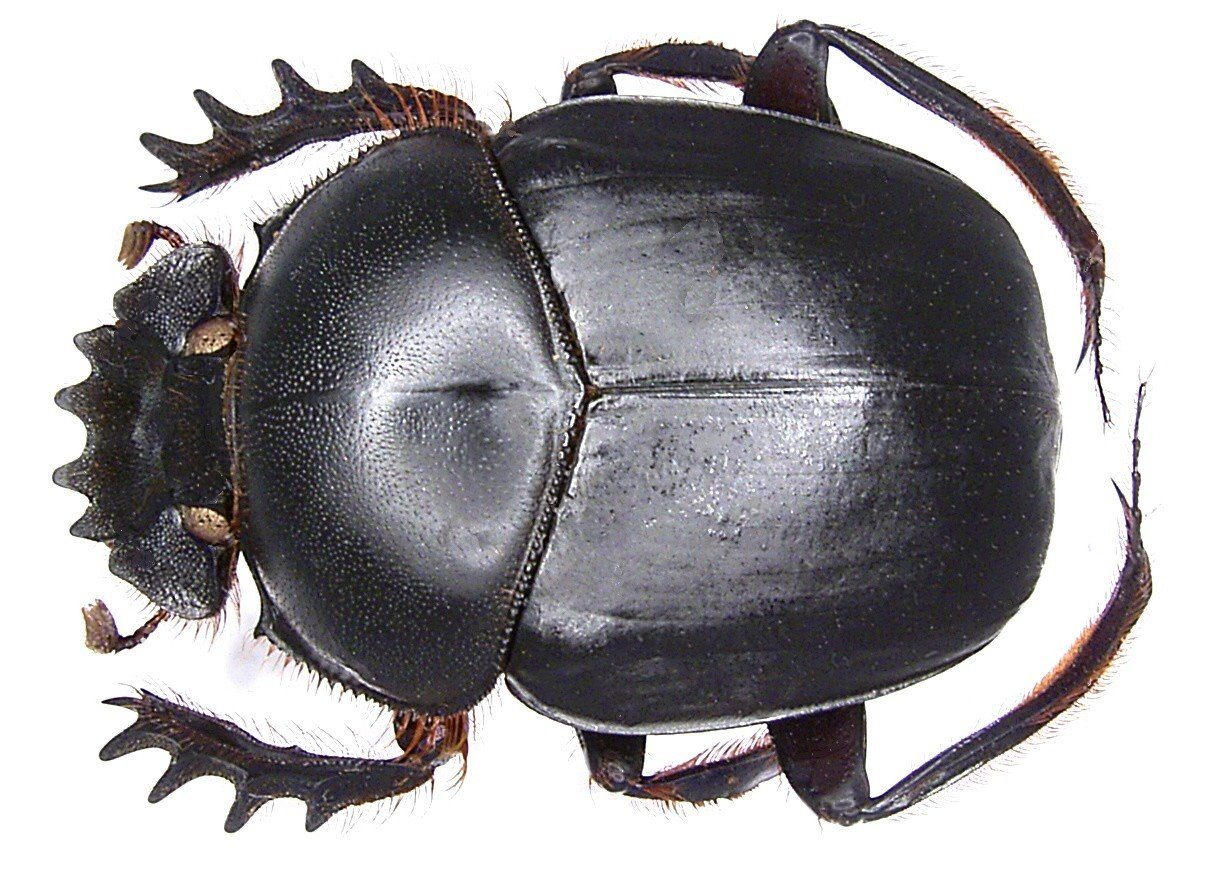
Scarabaeus gangeticus

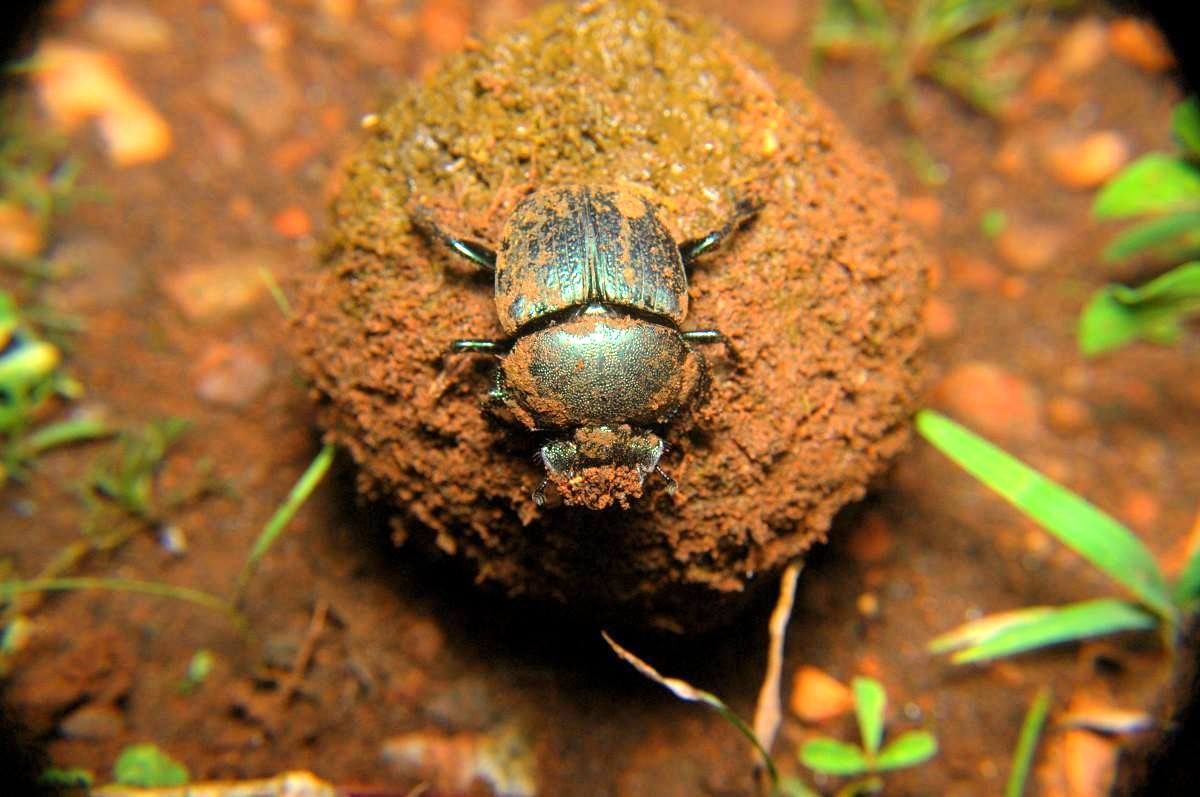
Scarabaeus sanctus

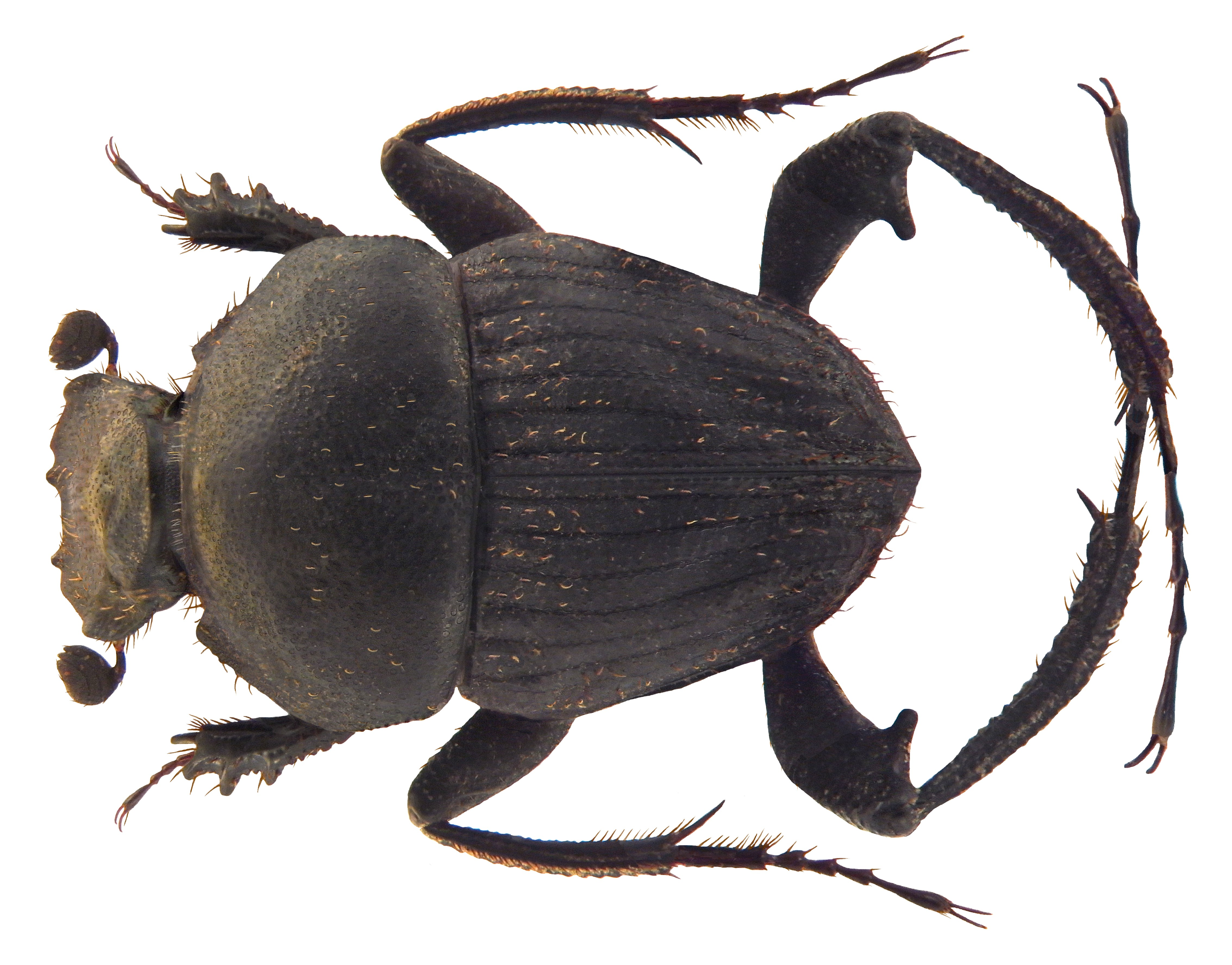
Sisyphus indicus male

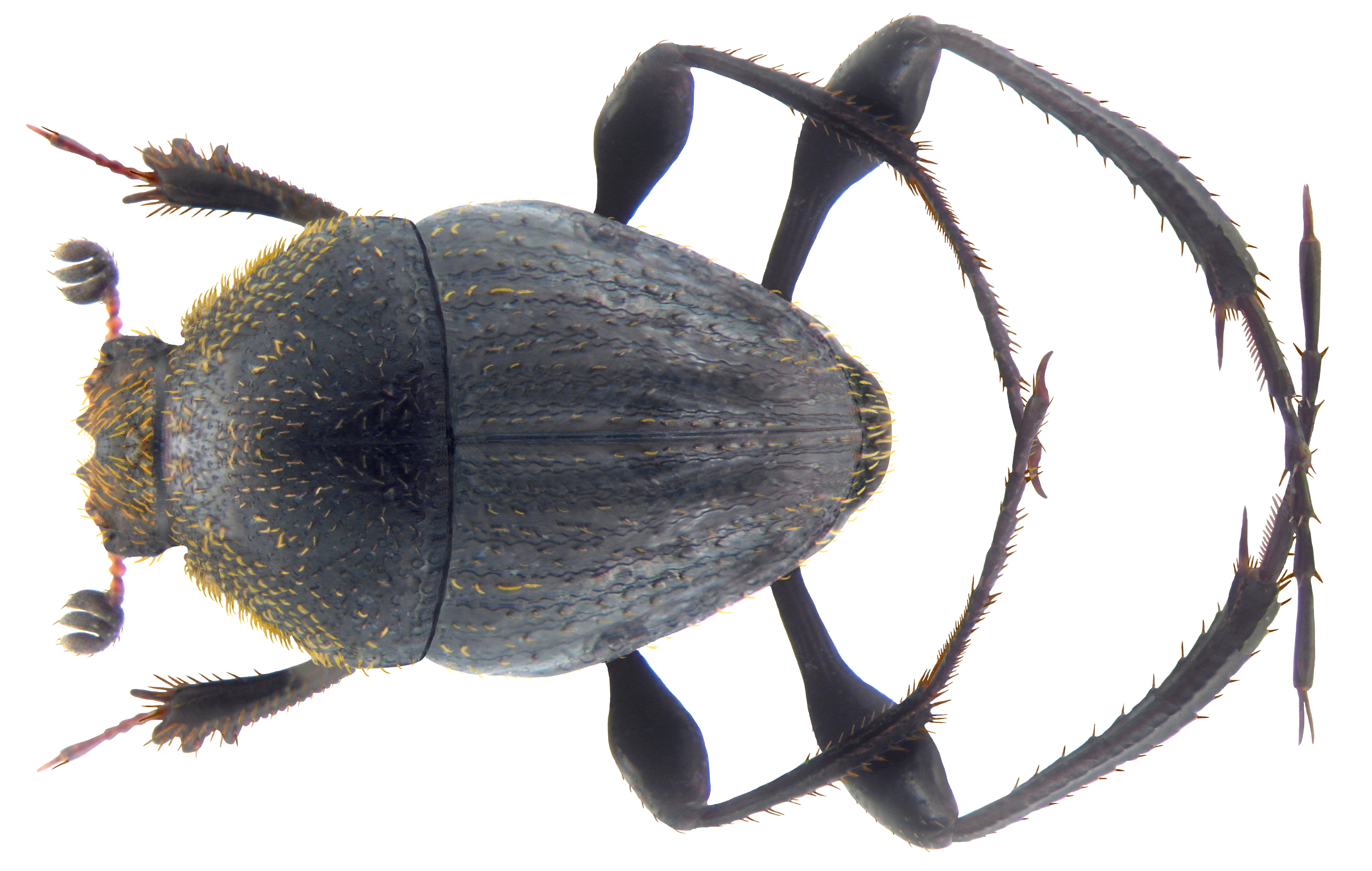
Sisyphus longipes

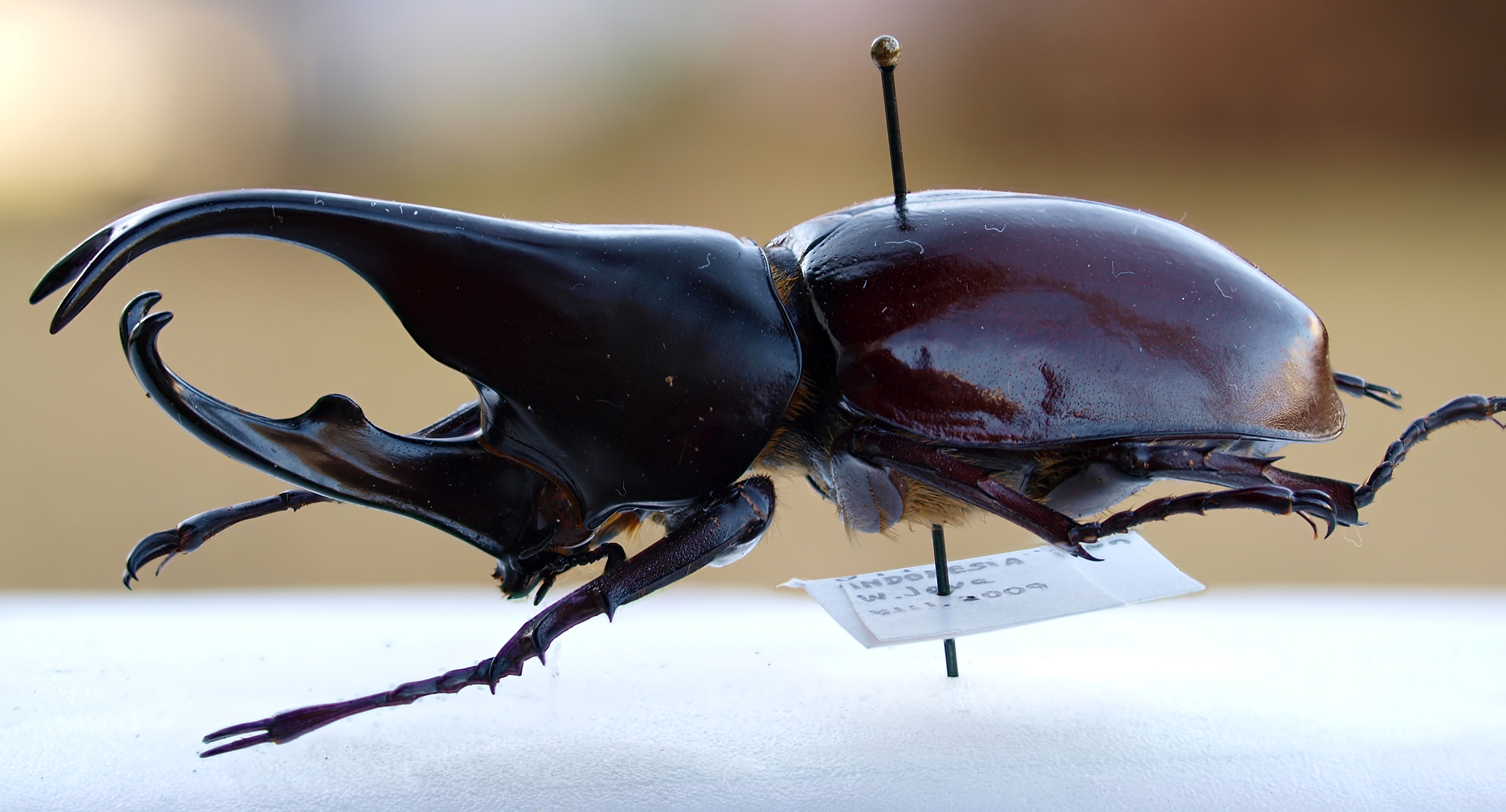
Xylotrupes gideon male

==== Subfamily: Aphodiinae - Aphodiine dung beetles ====
- Aganocrossus amoenus
- Aganocrossus pallidicornis
- Alocoderus elongatulus
- Ammoecioides spectabilis - ssp. tricarinulatus
- Aphodius humilis
- Aphodius insularis
- Aphodius lewisi
- Aphodius urostigma
- Ataenius ceylonensis
- Calamosternus granarius
- Chaetopisthes singalensis
- Labarrus hoabinhensis
- Leiopsammodius indicus
- Liothorax kraatzi
- Mesontoplatys rufolaterus
- Neocalaphodius moestus
- Neotrichiorhyssemus hegeri
- Paradidactylia biseriatus
- Paradidactylia haafi
- Paradidactylia ovatulus
- Paradidactylia wichei
- Phalacronothus carinulatus
- Phalacronothus ceylonensis
- Pharaphodius crenatus
- Pharaphodius robustus
- Pharaphodius lewisi
- Pharaphodius ratnapurensis
- Pleurophorus cracens
- Psammodius tesari
- Rhyssemus granulosus
- Rhyssemus indicus
- Rhyssemus inscitus
- Rhyssemus loebli
- Saprosites dynastoides
- Saprosites loebli
- Saprosites sulciceps
- Sybax impressicollis
- Trichaphodius moorei
- Trichiorhyssemus fruhstorferi
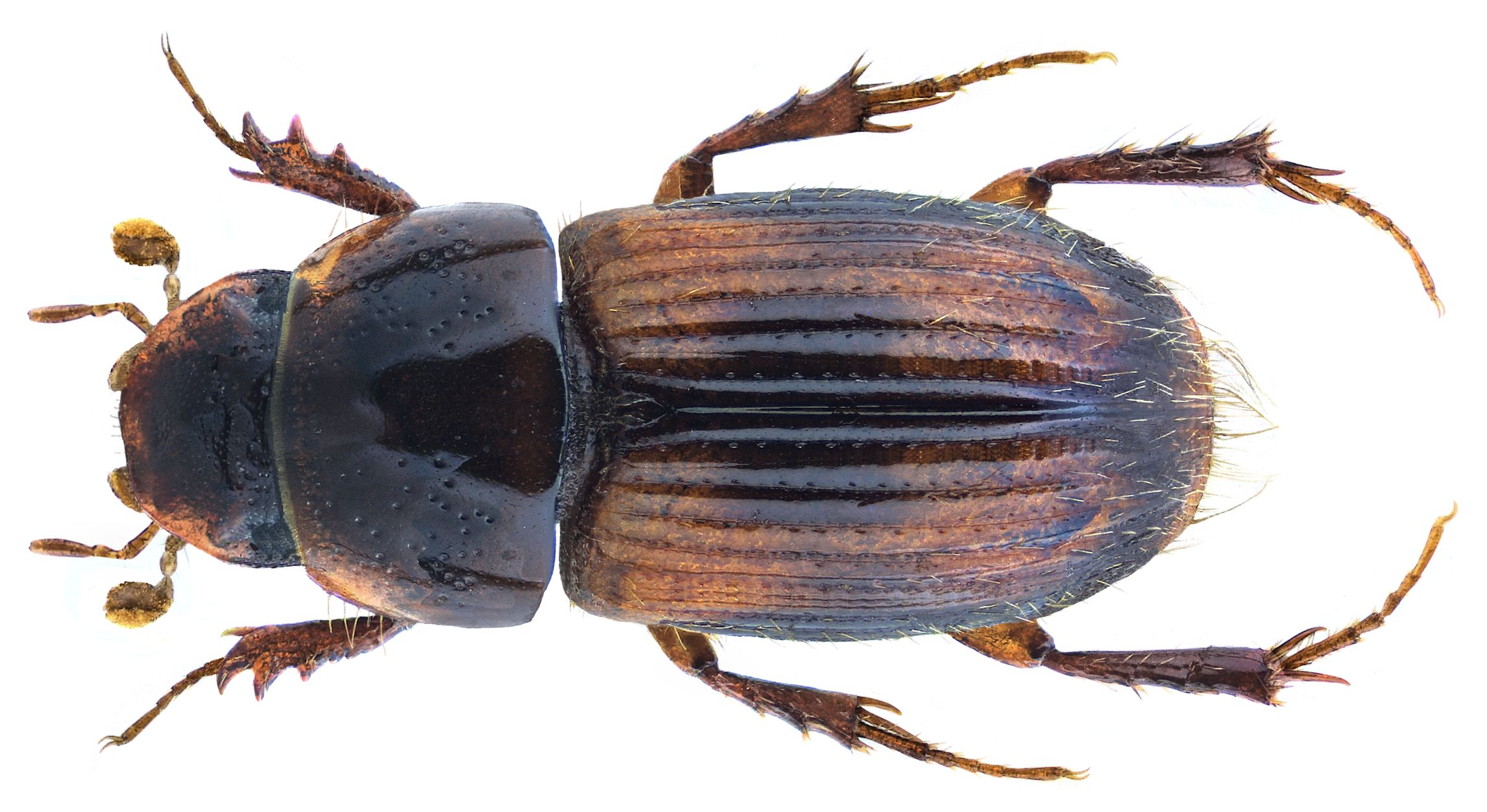
Aganocrossus amoenus

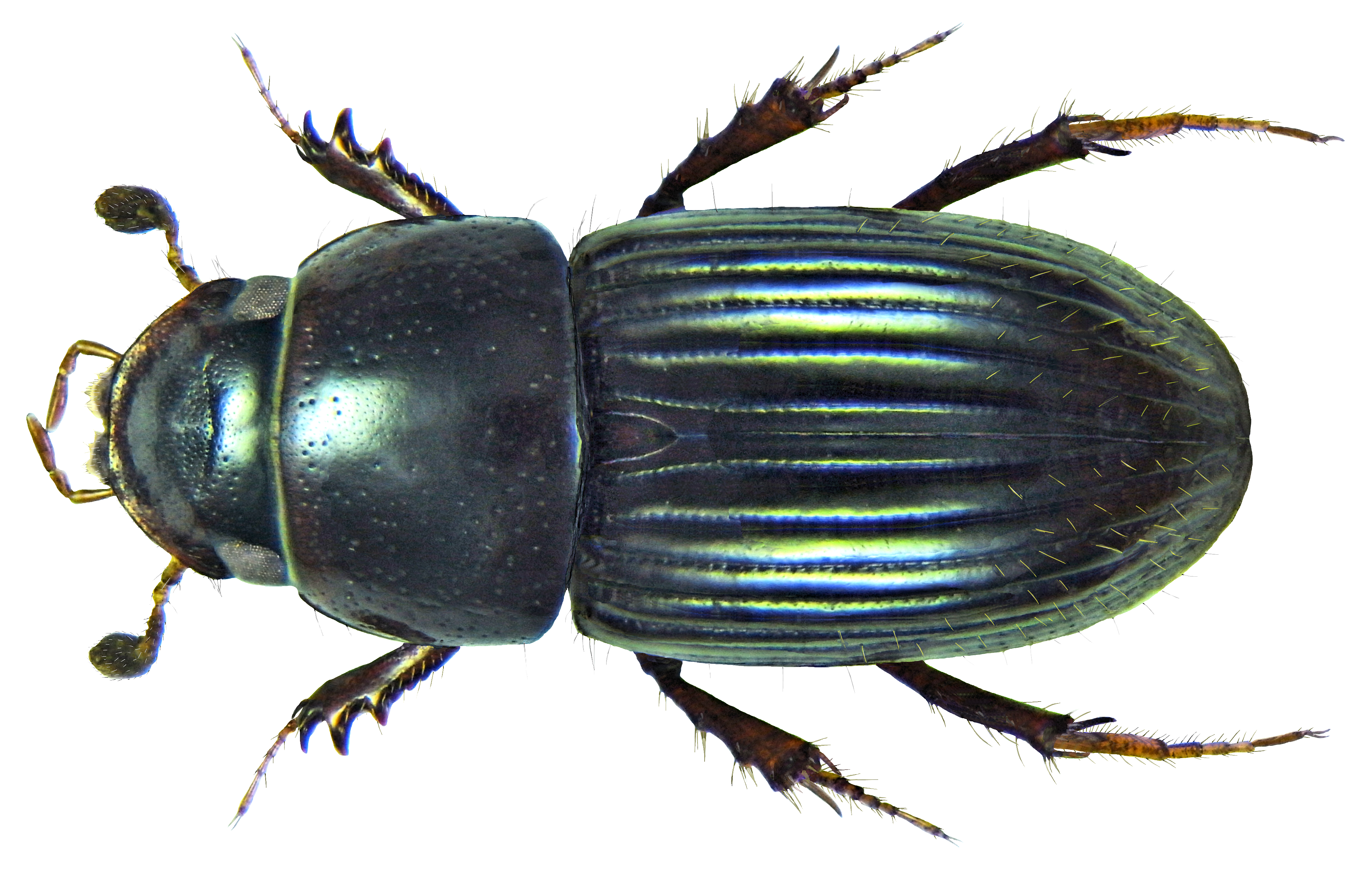
Aphodius urostigma

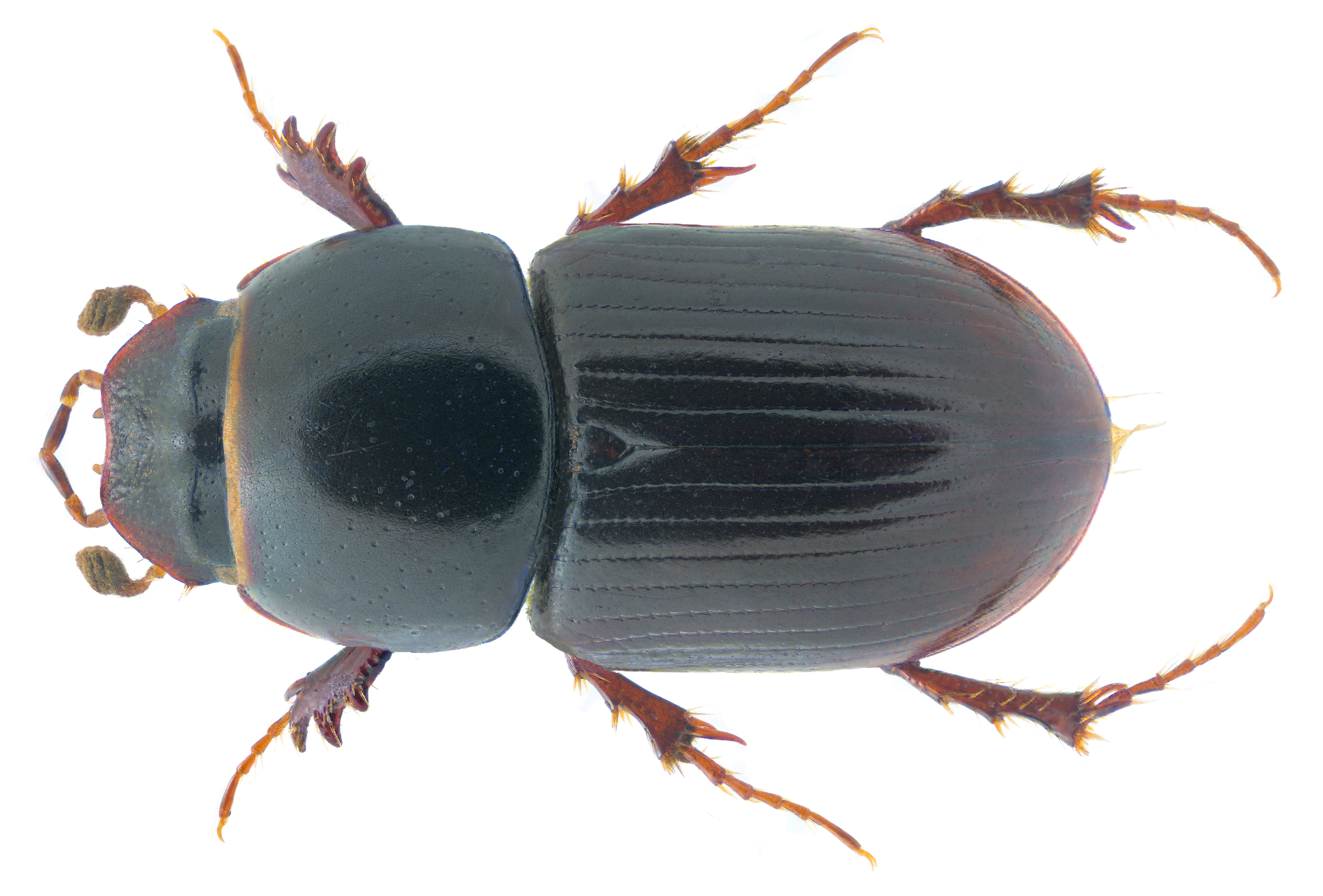
Calamosternus granarius

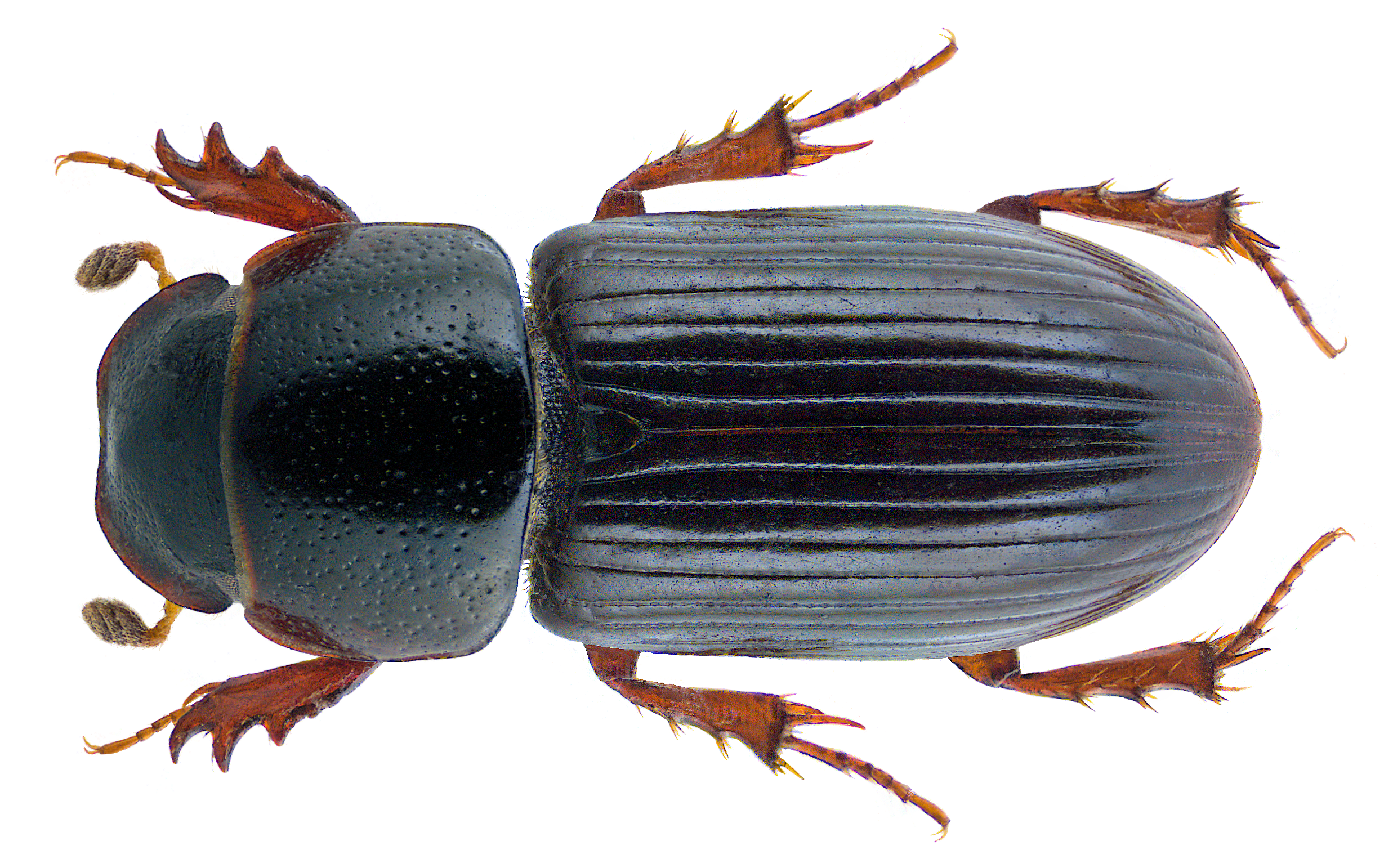
Liothorax kraatzi

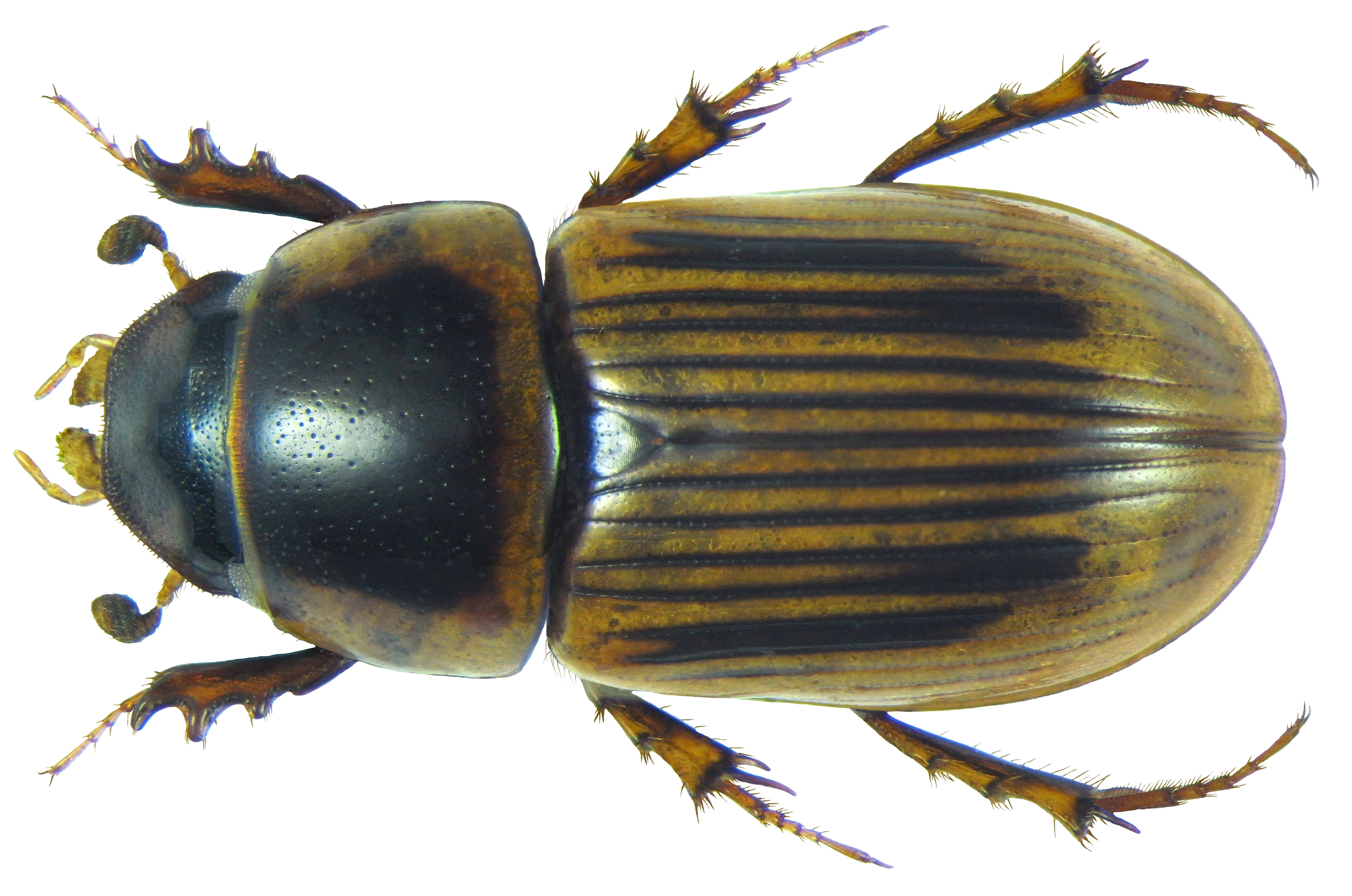
Neocalaphodius moestus

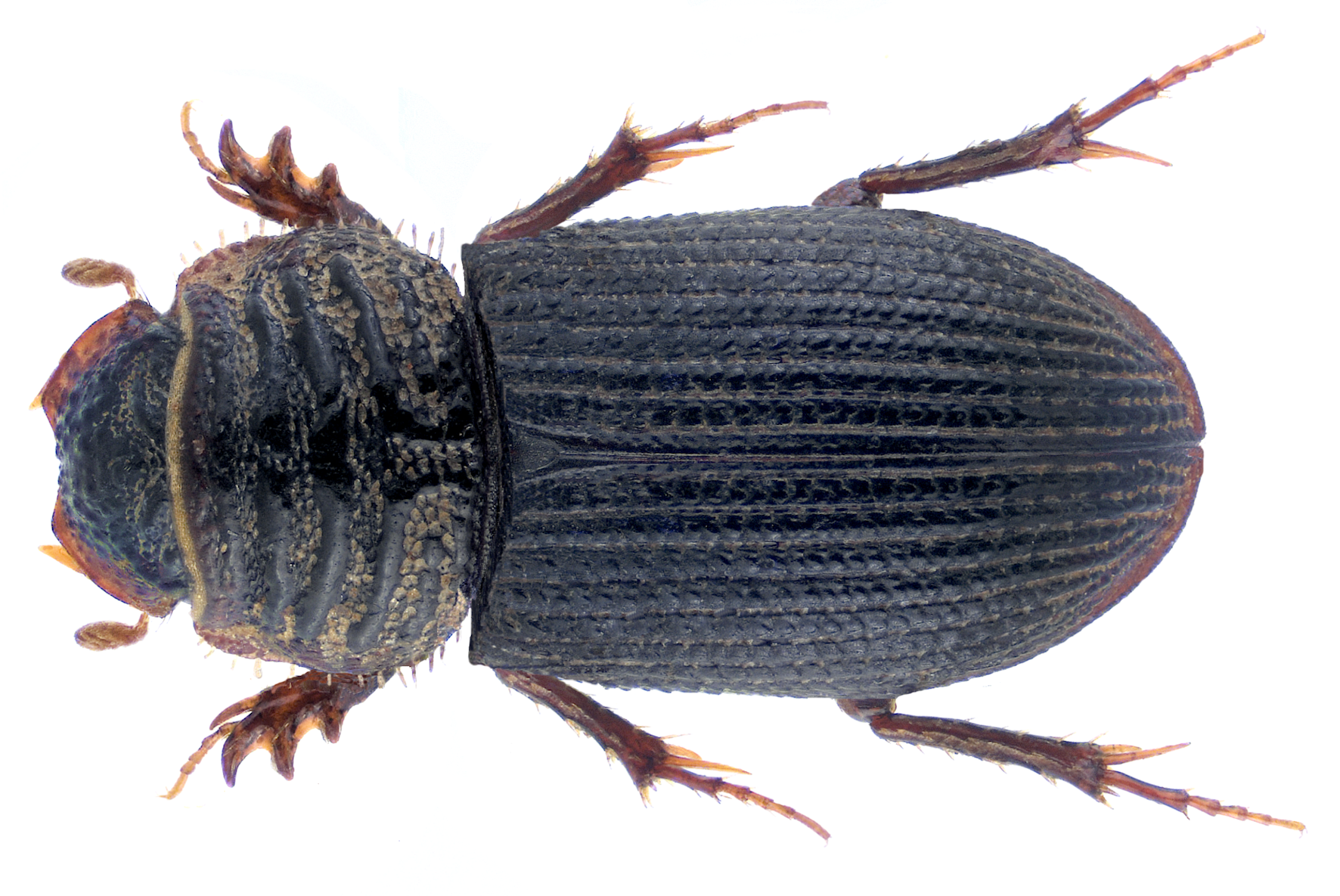
Rhyssemus inscitus

==== Subfamily: Melolonthinae - White grubs ====
- Apogonia aequabilis
- Apogonia blanchardi
- Apogonia cava
- Apogonia comosa
- Apogonia coriacea
- Apogonia expeditonis
- Apogonia ferruginea
- Apogonia fulvosetosa
- Apogonia gracilis
- Apogonia laevissima
- Apogonia lateralis
- Apogonia lurida
- Apogonia nana
- Apogonia nietneri
- Apogonia prolixa
- Apogonia rauca
- Apogonia solida
- Autoserica dubia
- Autoserica pubescens
- Autoserica srilanka
- Brahmina flavipennis
- Dichelomorpha glabrilinea
- Dichelomorpha punctuligera
- Engertia maculosa
- Holotrichia ceylonensis
- Holotrichia convexifrons
- Holotrichia danielssoni
- Holotrichia disparilis
- Holotrichia eurystoma
- Holotrichia furcifer
- Holotrichia inducta
- Holotrichia kandulawai
- Holotrichia opuana
- Holotrichia parva
- Holotrichia remorata
- Holotrichia reynaudi
- Holotrichia rufoflava
- Holotrichia schmitzi
- Holotrichia semitomentosa
- Holotrichia serrata
- Holotrichia setosa
- Idiochelyna pectoralis
- Lepidiota ferruginosa
- Leucopholis horni
- Leucopholis pinguis
- Maladera breviata
- Maladera calcarata
- Maladera cardoni
- Maladera chalybaea
- Maladera cinnaberina
- Maladera coxalis
- Maladera fistulosa
- Maladera immunita
- Maladera implicata
- Maladera insanabilis
- Maladera rotunda
- Maladera rufocuprea
- Maladera setosa
- Maladera singhalensis
- Maladera straba
- Maladera weligamana
- Neoserica bombycina
- Neoserica sexfoliata
- Neoserica splendifica
- Periserica fracta
- Periserica nigripennis
- Periserica picta
- Rhizotrogus aequalis
- Rhizotrogus hirtipectus
- Rhizotrogus sulcifer
- Schizonycha ruficollis
- Schizonycha singhalensis
- Selaserica nitida
- Selaserica pusilla
- Selaserica scutellaris
- Selaserica sericea
- Serica distincticornis
- Serica fusa
- Serica hamifera
- Serica interrupta
- Serica lurida
- Serica maculicauda
- Serica maculifera
- Serica nana
- Serica nepalensis
- Serica rubescens
- Serica semicincta
- Serica ventriosa
- Sophrops costatus
- Sophrops eurystomus
- Sophrops singhalensis
- Stephanopholis cribricollis
- Stephanopholis rubicundus
- Stephanopholis singhalensis
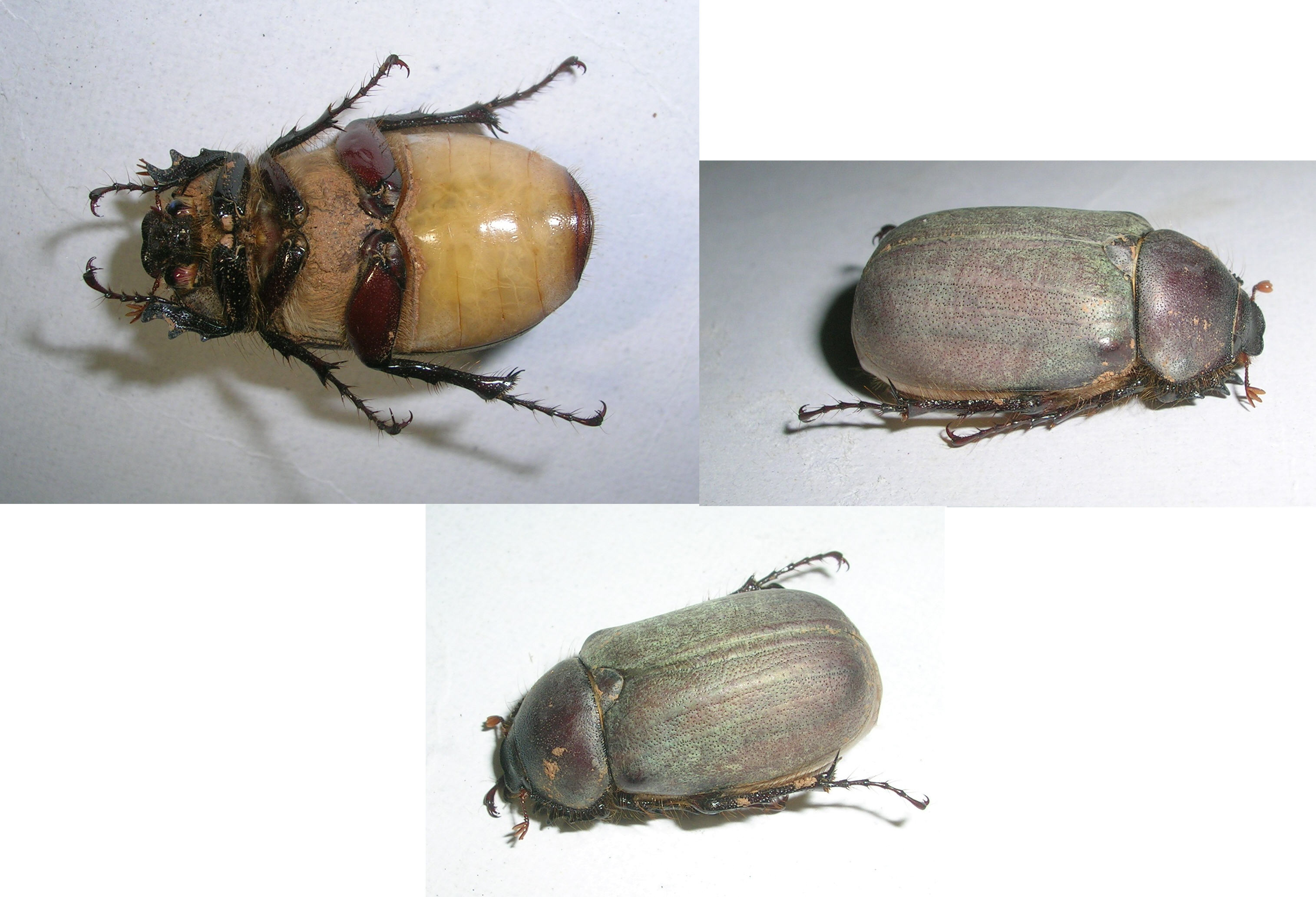
Holotrichia reynaudi

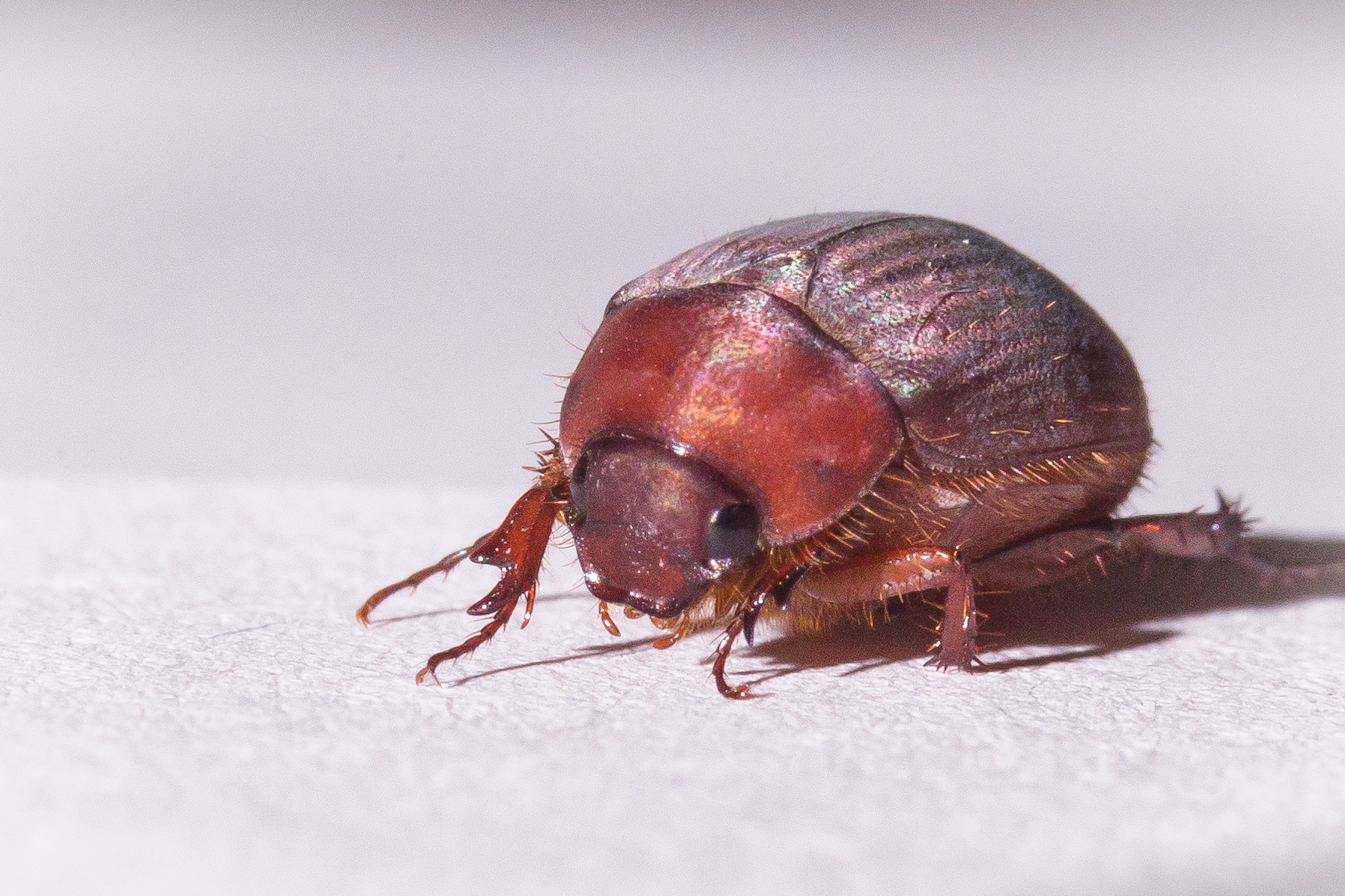
Maladera Insanabilis

==== Subfamily: Rutelinae - Shining Flower Chafers ====
- Adoretus bicaudatus
- Adoretus celogaster
- Adoretus chloronota
- Adoretus conformis
- Adoretus corpulentus
- Adoretus discalis
- Adoretus discors
- Adoretus duplicatus
- Adoretus dussumieri
- Adoretus erythrocephalus
- Adoretus feminalis
- Adoretus fracta
- Adoretus gravida
- Adoretus illusa
- Adoretus infantilis
- Adoretus leo
- Adoretus pellucida
- Adoretus procrastinator
- Adoretus ruficapilla
- Adoretus sorex
- Adoretus superflua
- Adoretus suturalis
- Adoretus varicolor
- Adoretus versutus
- Adoretus viridis
- Adoretus walkeri
- Callistethus bugnioni
- Callistethus chloromelus
- Callistethus princeps
- Lepadoretus compressus
- Lepadoretus ermineus
- Lepadoretus mavis
- Lepadoretus nietneri
- Micranomala cingalensis
- Mimela macleayana
- Mimela mundissima
- Parastasia basalis
- Parastasia cingala
- Parastasia lobata
- Popillia discalis
- Rhamphadoretus sorex
- Rhinyptia gilleti
- Rhinyptia meridionalis
- Singhala hindu
- Singhala tenella
- Trogonostomus ursus

=== Family: Scirtidae - Marsh beetles ===
- Cyphon besucheti
- Cyphon pseudoatratus

=== Family: Scraptiidae - False flower beetles ===
- Scraptia cingalensis
- Scraptia compressicollis
- Scraptia flavidula
- Scraptia fuscipennis
- Scraptia indica
- Scraptia setipes
- Scraptia xylophiloides

=== Family: Scydmaenidae - Ant-like stone beetles ===
- Euconnus intrusus
- Scydmaenus conicollis

=== Family: Silphidae - Carrion beetles ===
- Diamesus osculans
- Necrophila rufithorax
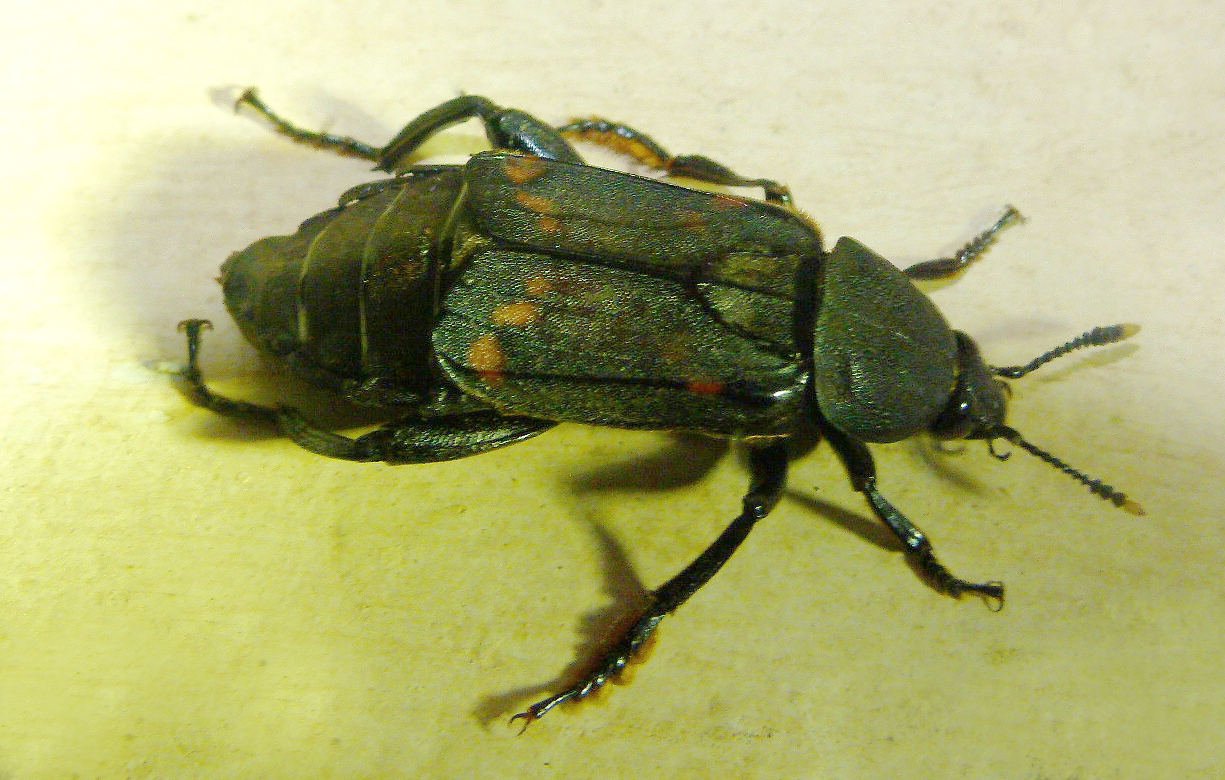
Diamesus osculans

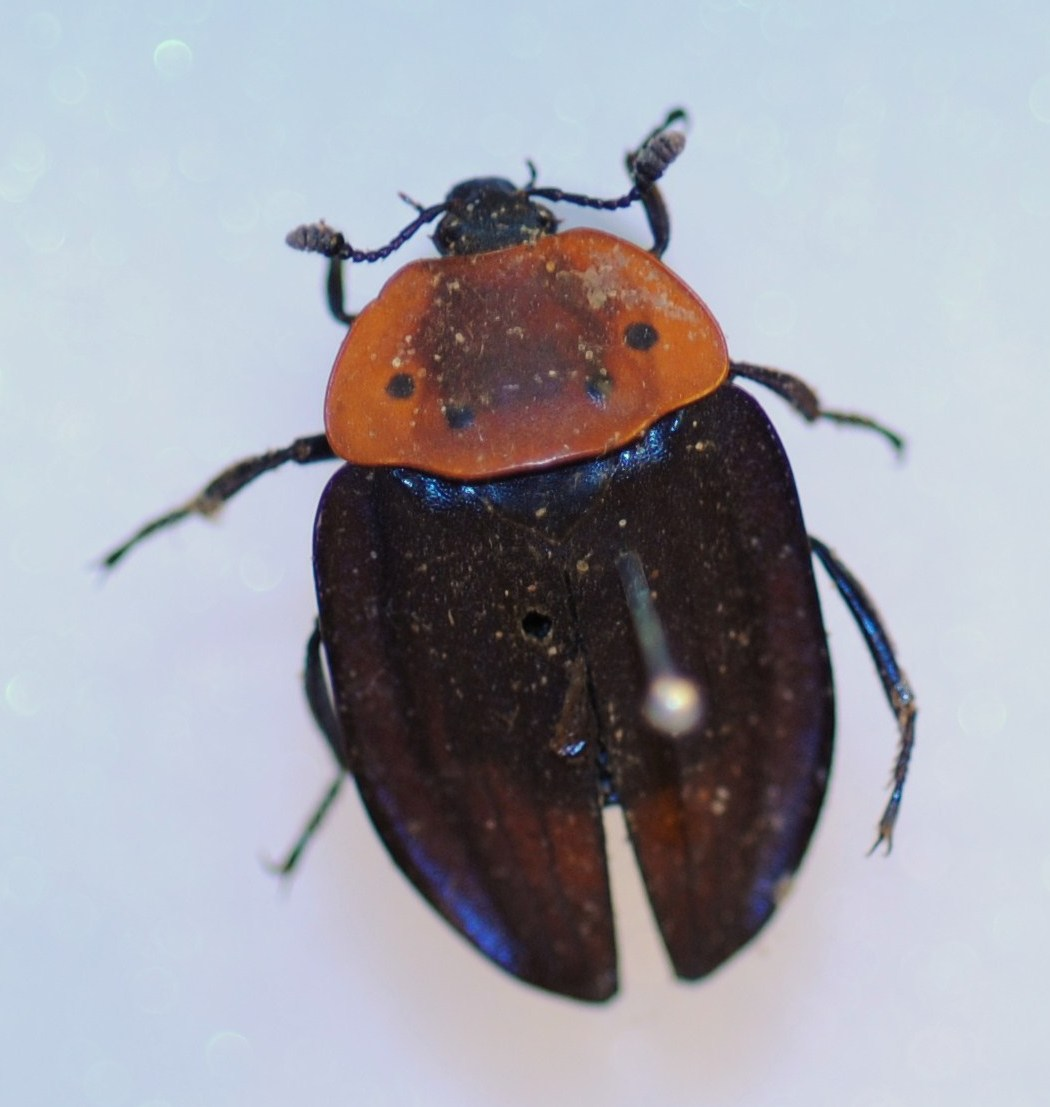
Necrophila rufithorax

=== Family: Silvanidae - Silvan flat bark beetles ===
- Lyctus brunneus
- Monanus concinnulus
- Monanus horni
- Monanus rugosus
- Oryzaephilus acuminatus
- Oryzaephilus genalis
- Oryzaephilus mercator
- Oryzaephilus surinamensis
- Parahyliota serricollis
- Protosilvanus granosus
- Psammoecus delicatus
- Psammoecus elegans
- Psammoecus felix
- Psammoecus gentilis
- Psammoecus simoni
- Psammoecus trimaculatus
- Silvanolomus denticollis
- Silvanoprus cephalotes
- Silvanoprus distinguendus
- Silvanoprus longicollis
- Silvanoprus porrectus
- Silvanus difficilis
- Silvanus imitatus
- Silvanus lewisi
- Silvanus recticollis
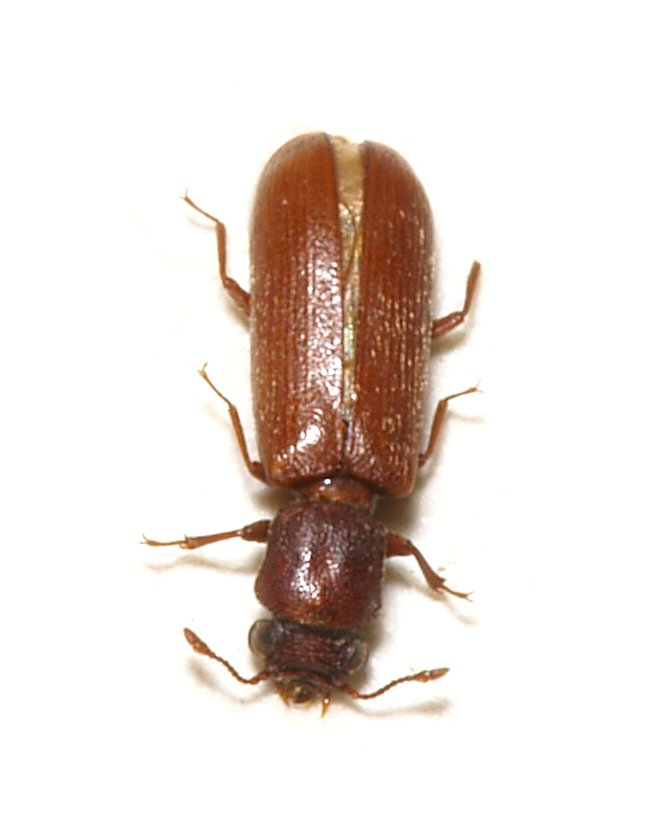
Lyctus brunneus

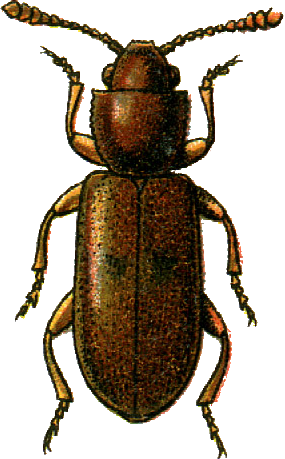
Emporius signatus

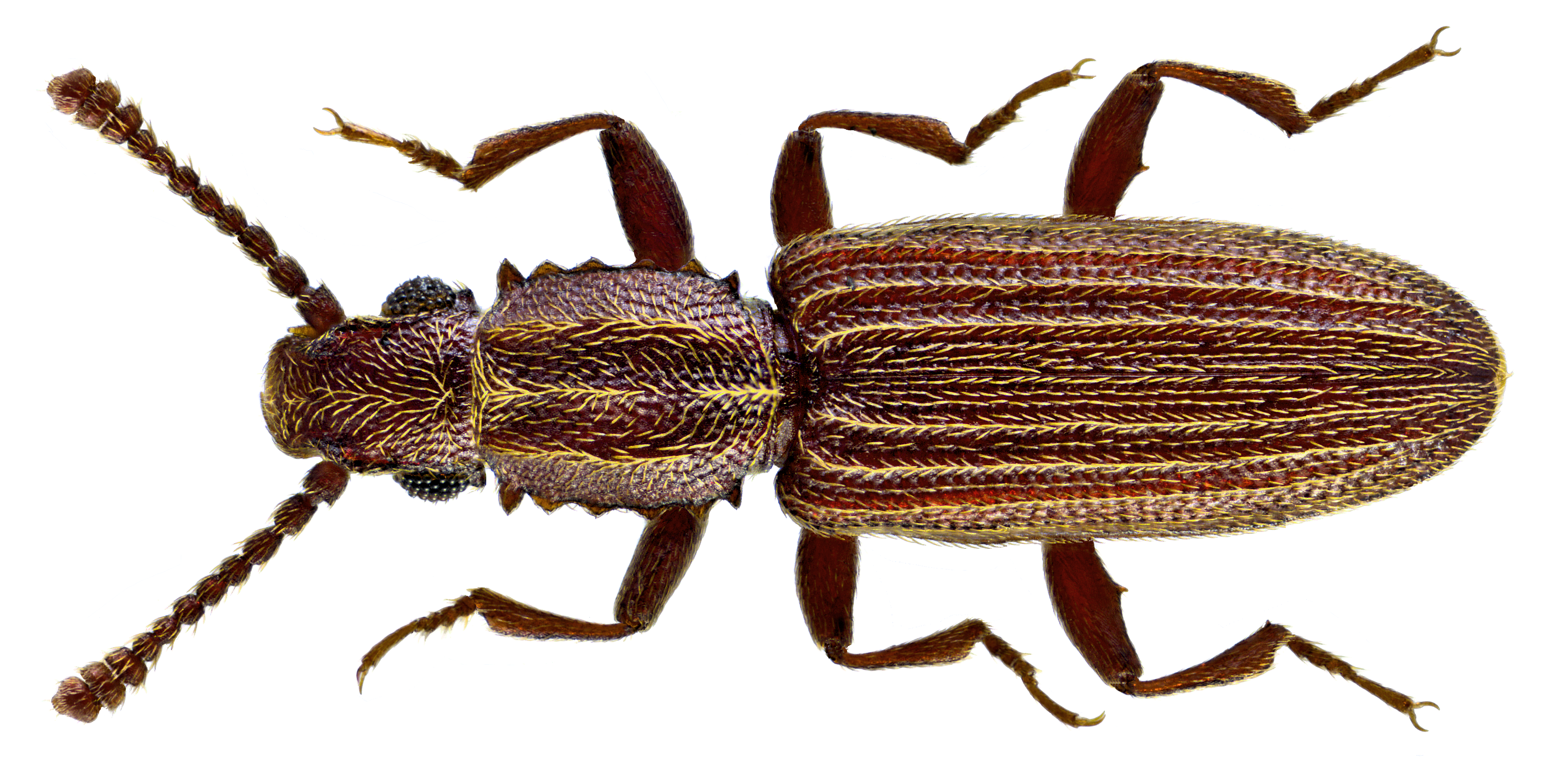
Oryzaephilus mercator

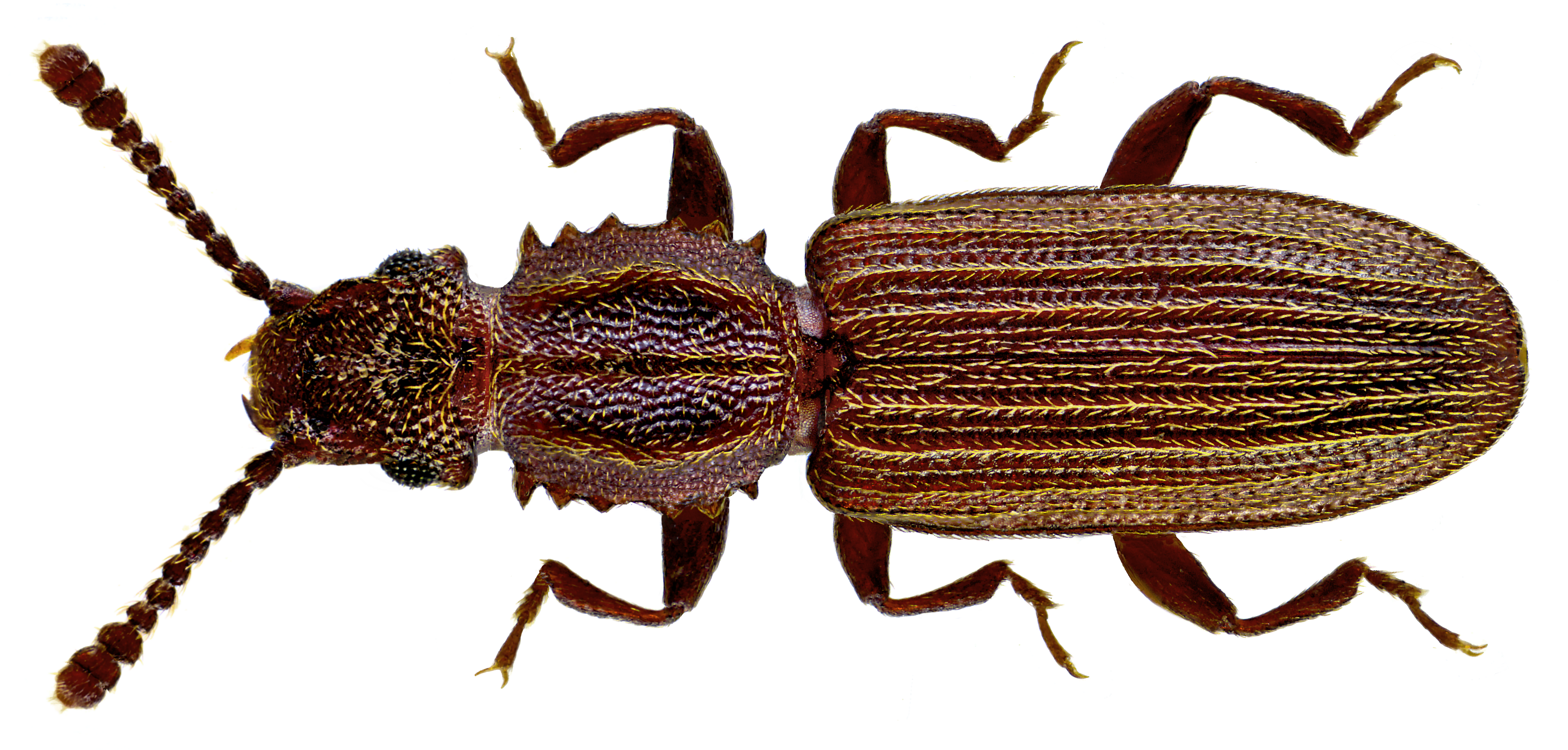
Oryzaephilus surinamensis

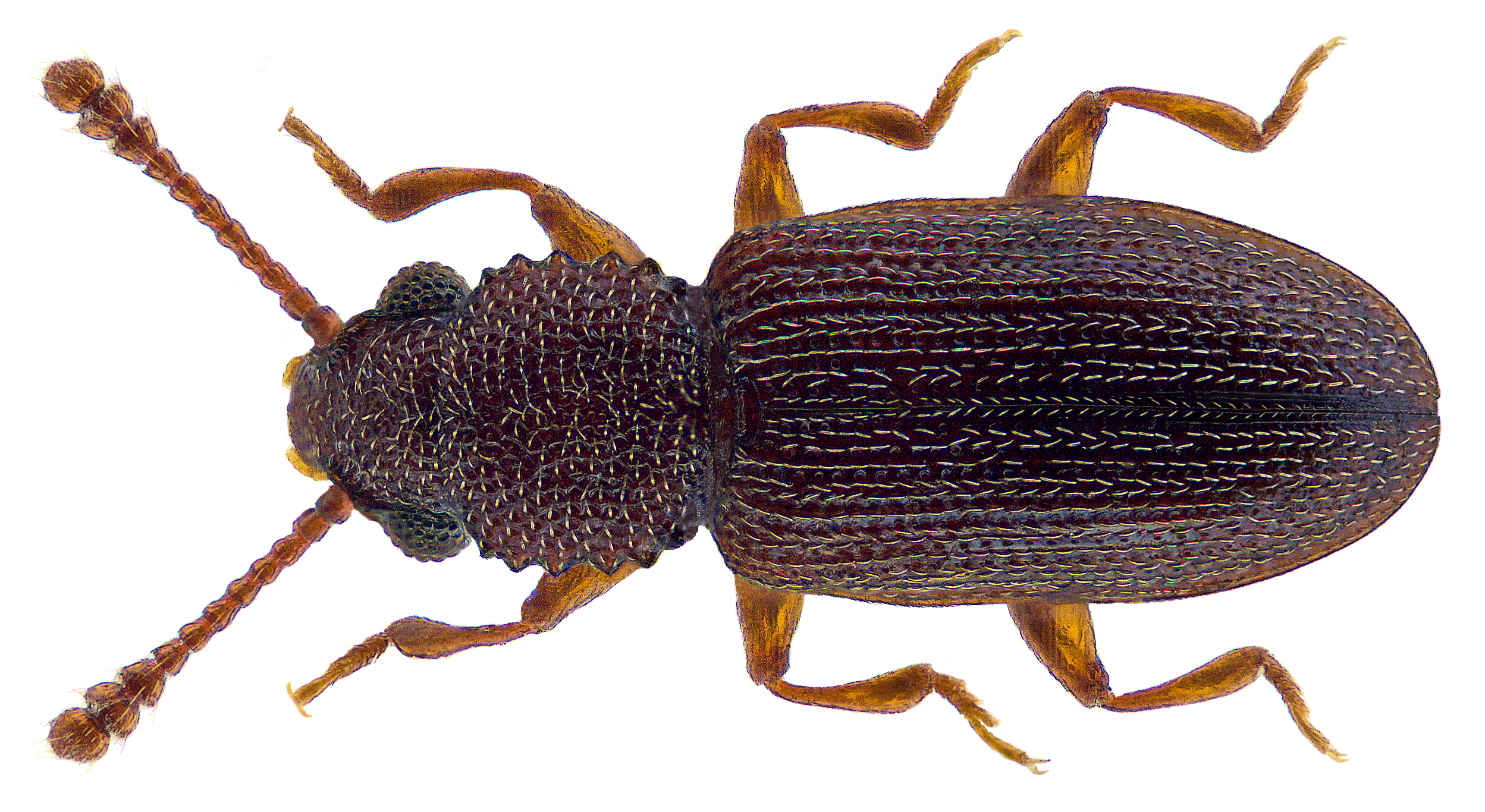
Silvanolomus denticollis

=== Family: Staphylinidae - Rove beetles ===
- Anotylus exiguus
- Anotylus glareosus
- Anotylus hybridus
- Anotylus insecatus
- Anotylus latiusculus
- Anotylus tetracarinatus
- Baeocera longicornis
- Batribolbus palpator
- Batrisiella satoi
- Carpelimus fuliginosus
- Cilea limbifer
- Clidicus minilankanus
- Erymus gracilis
- Oligota parva
- Oxytelopsis pseudopsina
- Oxytelus bengalensis
- Oxytelus incisus
- Oxytelus lividus
- Oxytelus migrator
- Oxytelus nigriceps
- Oxytelus puncticeps
- Oxytelus varipennis
- Scaphisoma stictum
- Scopaeus testaceus
- Stenus bicornis
- Stenus cordatus
- Stenus melanarius
- Stenus serupeus
- Stenus solutus
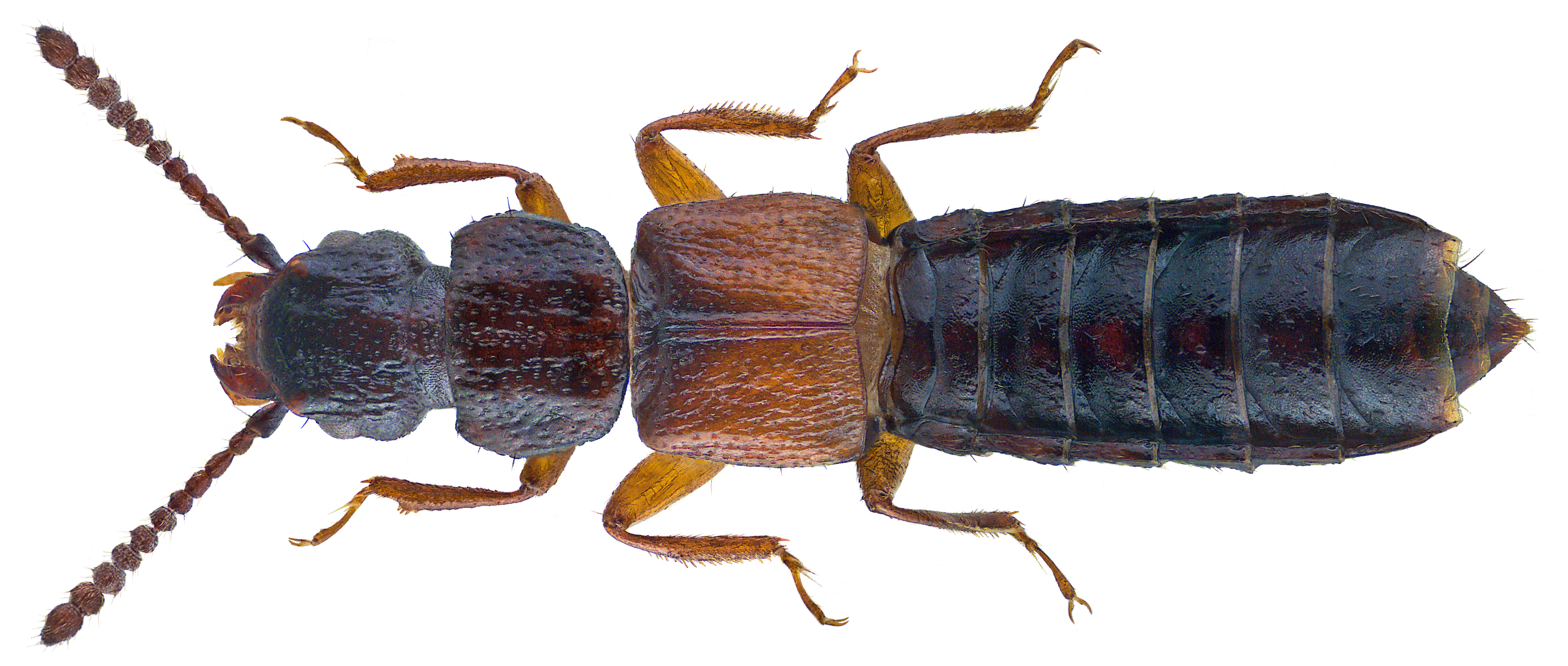
Anotylus insecatus

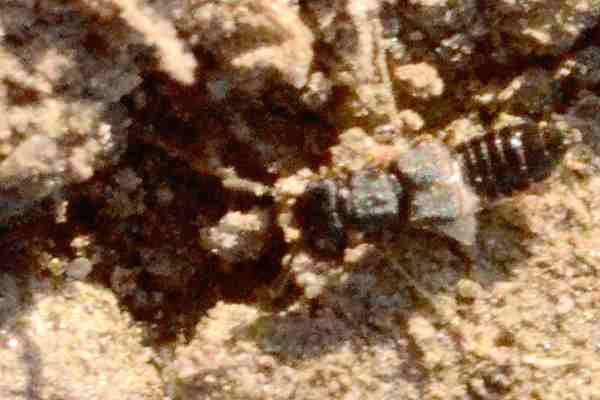
Anotylus tetracarinatus

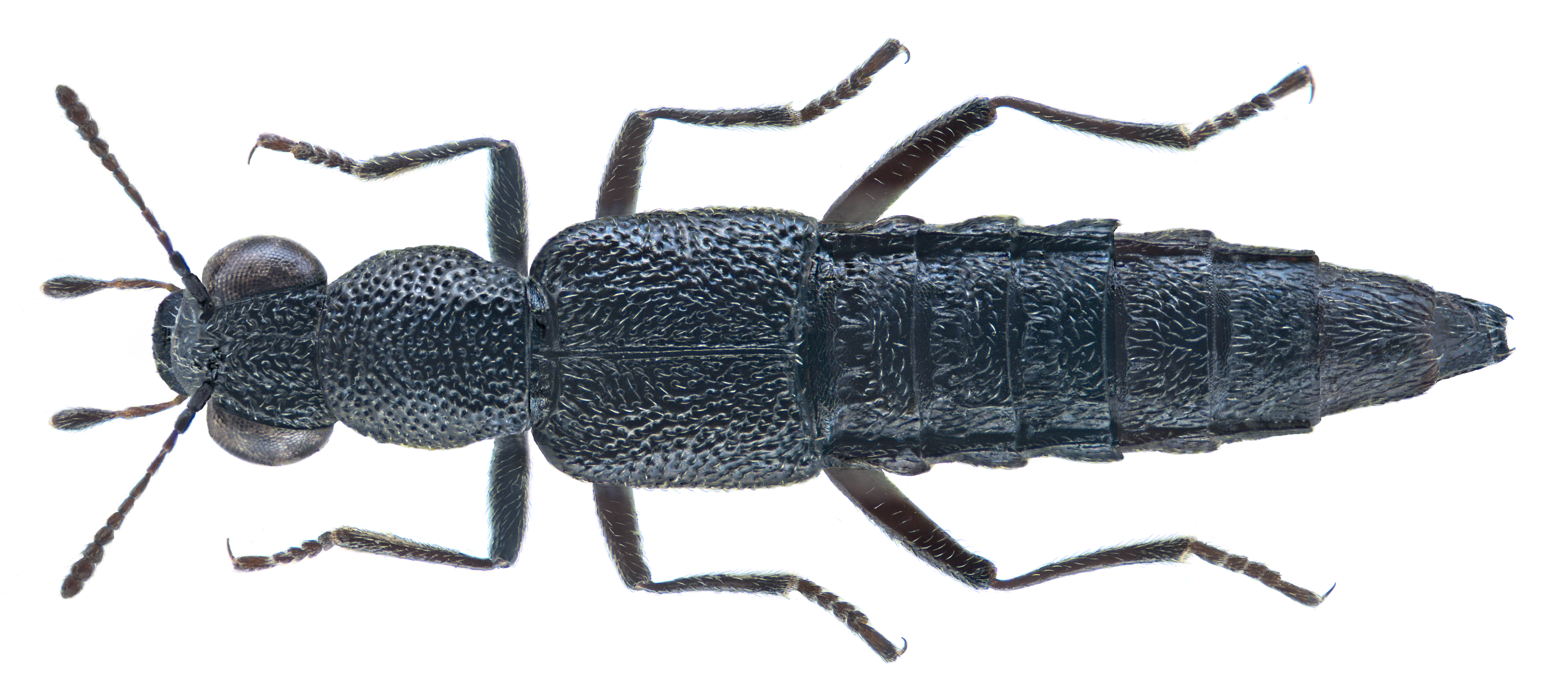
Stenus melanarius

=== Family: Tenebrionidae - Darkling beetles ===
- Alphitobius laevigatus
- Amarygmus picicornis
- Ceropria induta
- Corticeus cephalotes
- Eutochia aptera
- Falsandrosus tetrops
- Gonocephalum depressum
- Laena formaneki
- Leichenum canaliculatum
- Oedemutes tumidus
- Pimelia undulata
- Platydemoides brincki
- Sternocera chrysis
- Tribolium castaneum
- Uloma bituberosa
- Uloma polita
- Ulomimus indicus
- Ulomina carinata
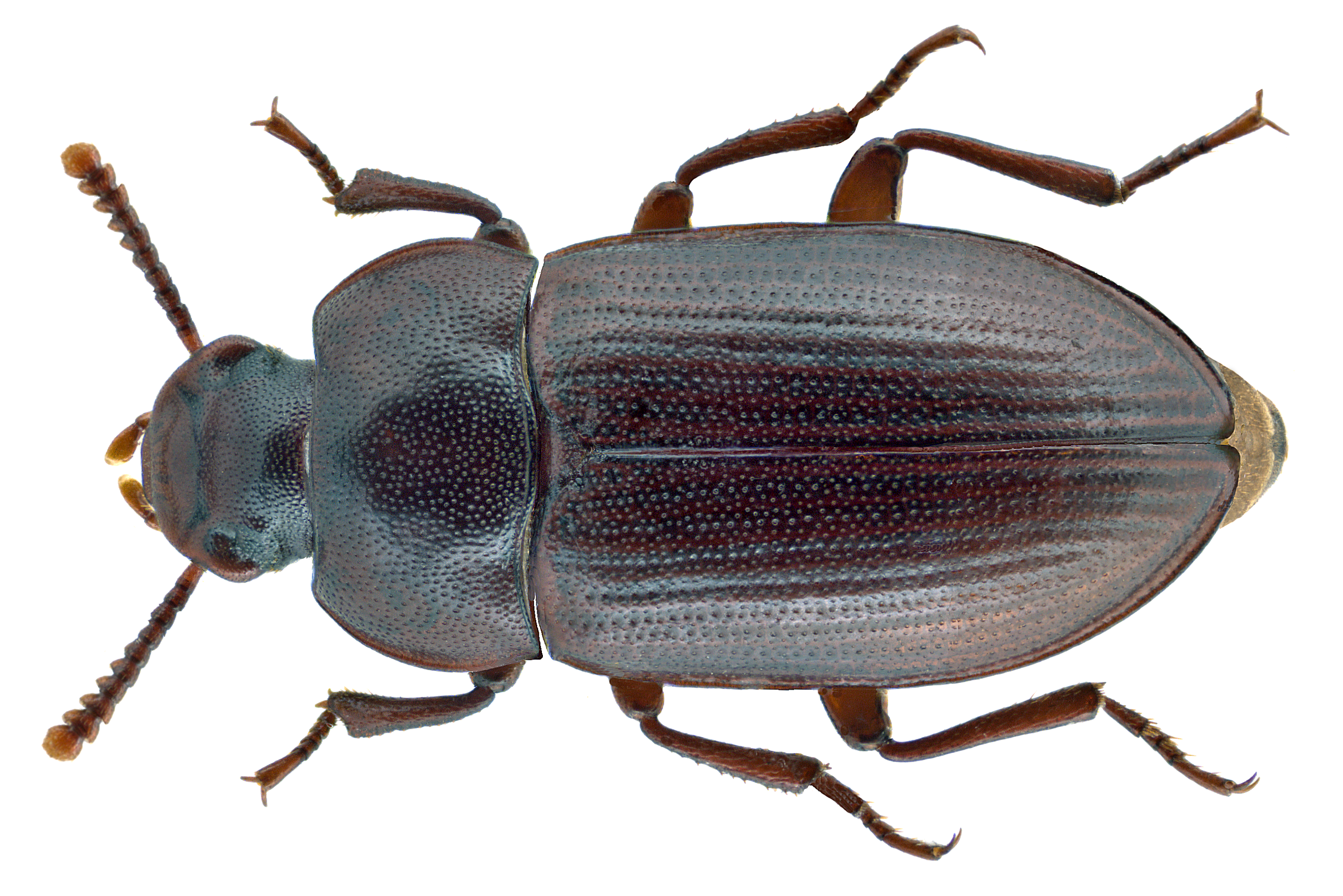
Alphitobius laevigatus

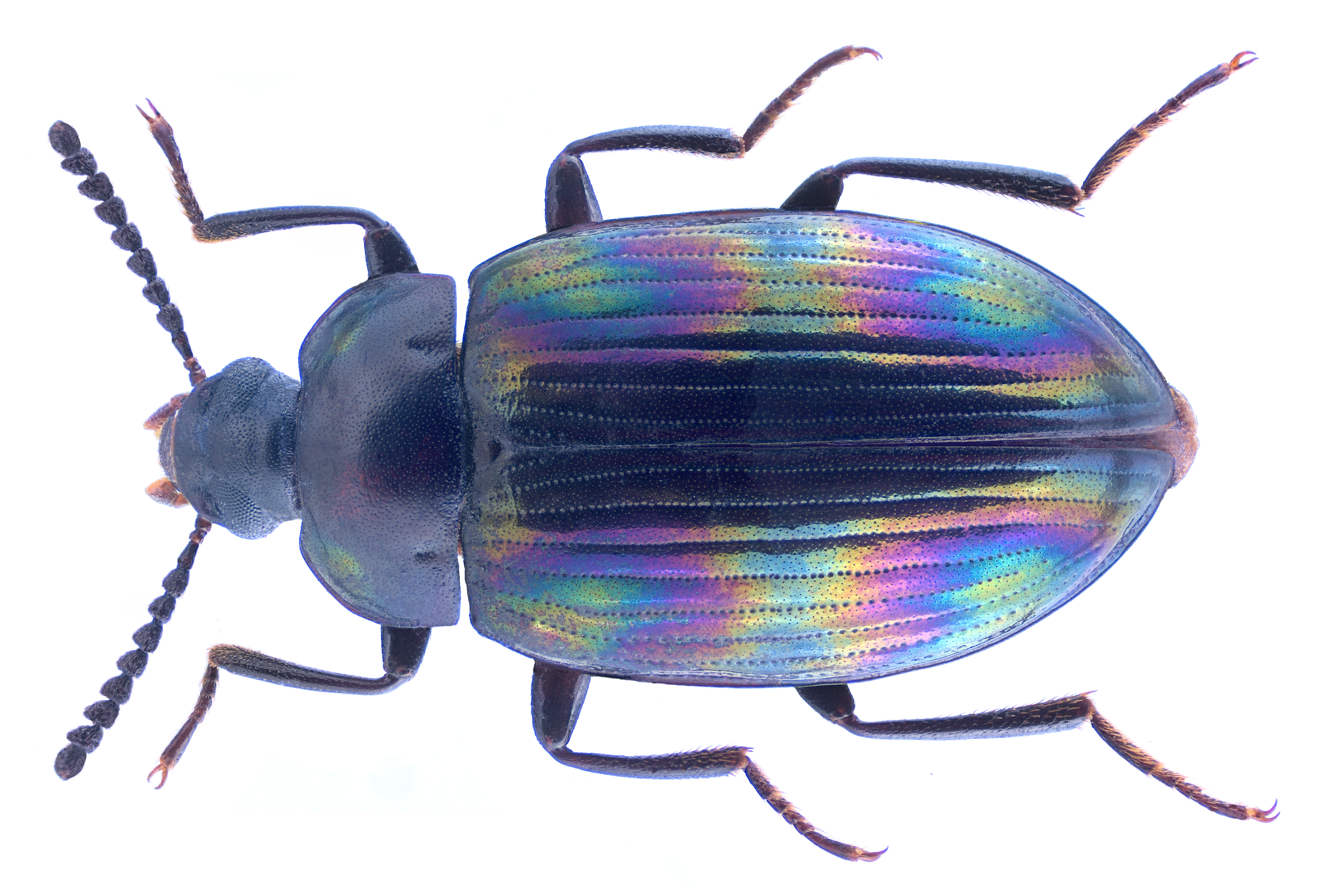
Ceropria induta

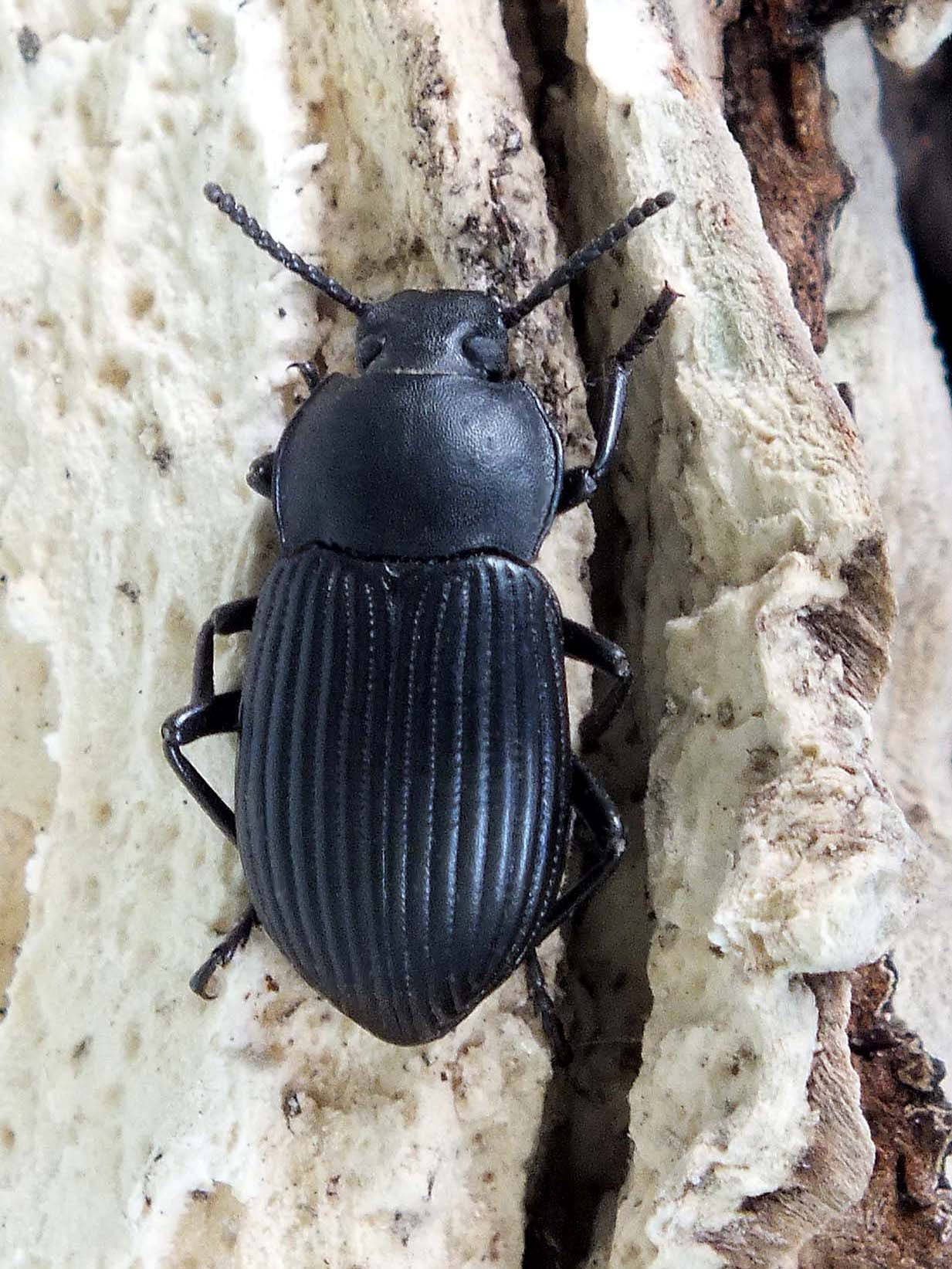
Gonocephalum depressum

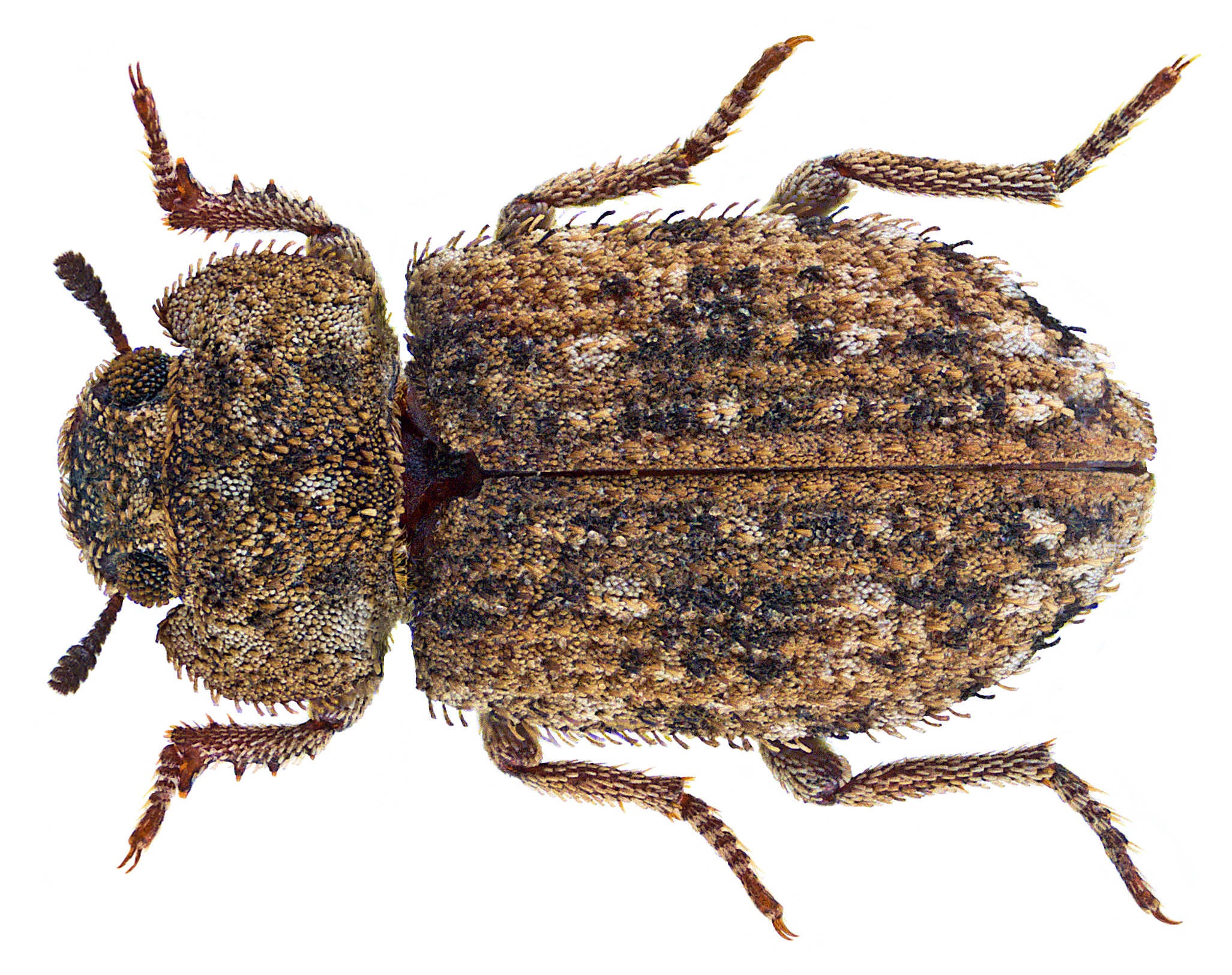
Leichenum variegatum

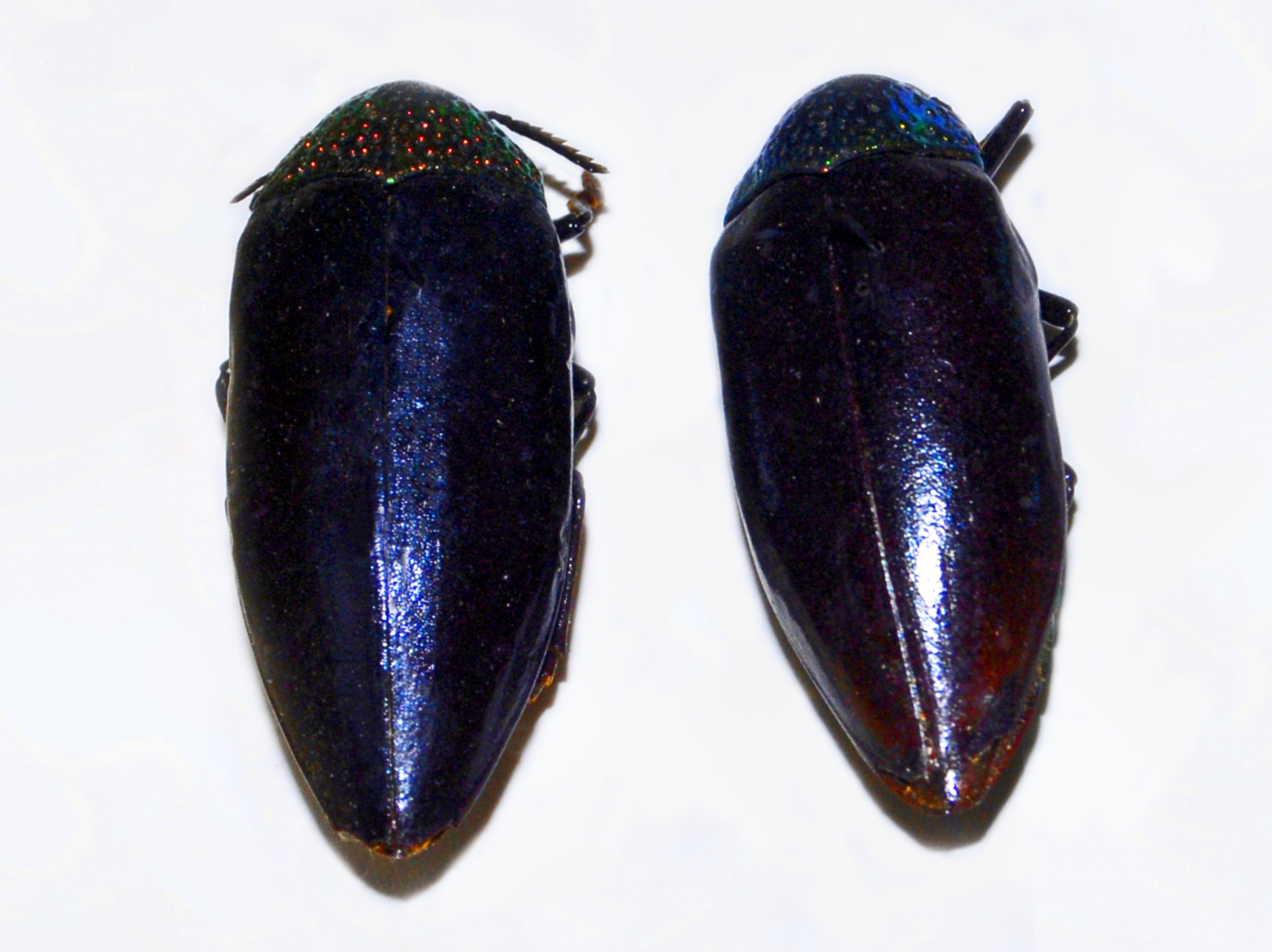
Sternocera chrysis

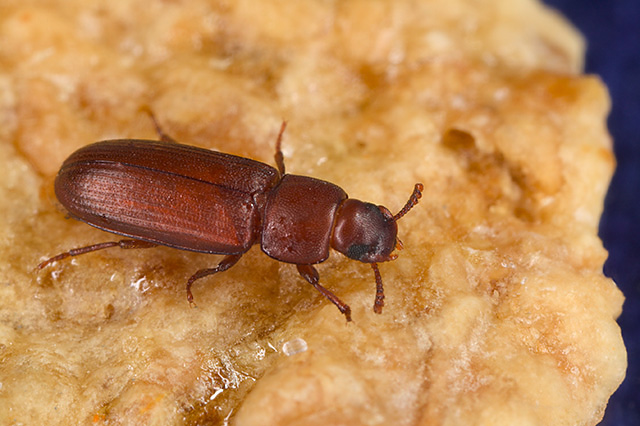
Tribolium castaneum

=== Family: Trictenotomidae - Croc beetles ===
- Trictenotoma templetoni

=== Family: Trogidae - Hide beetles ===
- Omorgus (Afromorgus) frater
- Omorgus (Afromorgus) granulatus
- Omorgus (Afromorgus) inclusus
- Omorgus (Afromorgus) inermis
- Omorgus (Afromorgus) maissouri
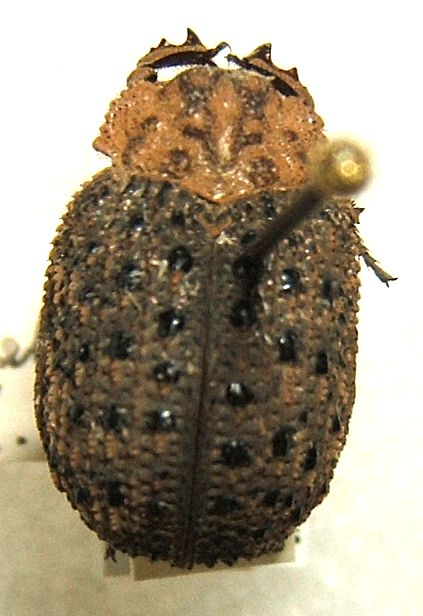
Omorgus granulatus

=== Family: Vesperidae - Vesperid longicorn beetles ===
- Doesus taprobanicus

=== Family: Zopheridae - Ironclad beetles ===
- Bitoma siviana
- Cebia rugosa
- Microprius rufulus
- Monomma brunneum
- Nematidium elongatum
- Trachypholis hispidum
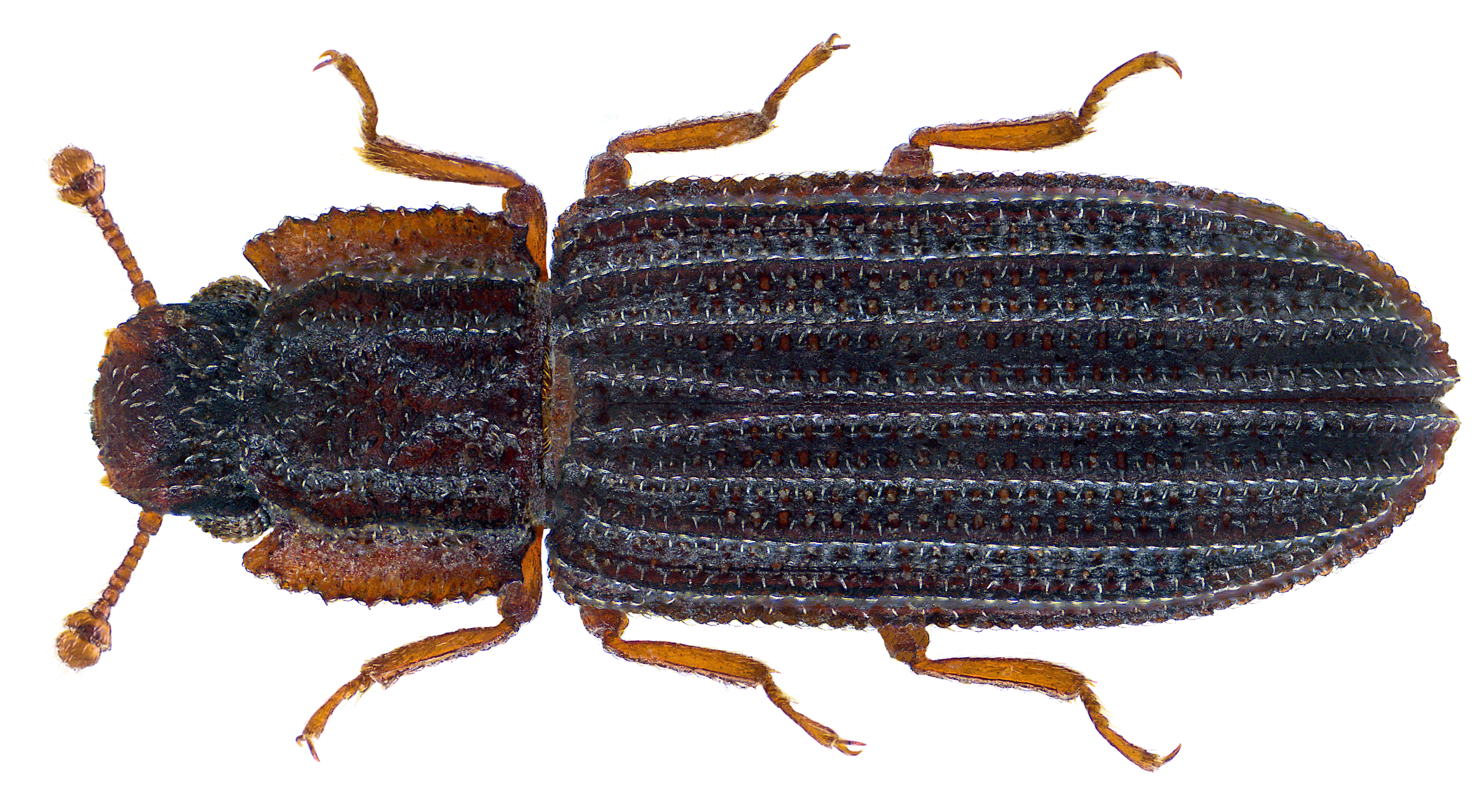
Microprius rufulus
