= Sybra longipes =

Scientific classification
- Kingdom: Animalia
- Phylum: Arthropoda
- Class: Insecta
- Order: Coleoptera
- Suborder: Polyphaga
- Infraorder: Cucujiformia
- Family: Cerambycidae
- Genus: Sybra
- Species: S. longipes

Binomial name
- Sybra longipes Breuning & de Jong, 1941

Species of beetle

Sybra longipes is a species of beetle in the family Cerambycidae. It was described by Stephan von Breuning and de Jong in 1941.
