= Sybra venosa =

Scientific classification
- Kingdom: Animalia
- Phylum: Arthropoda
- Clade: Pancrustacea
- Class: Insecta
- Order: Coleoptera
- Suborder: Polyphaga
- Infraorder: Cucujiformia
- Family: Cerambycidae
- Genus: Sybra
- Species: S. venosa

Binomial name
- Sybra venosa Pascoe, 1865

Species of beetle

Sybra venosa is a species of longhorn beetle in the family Cerambycidae. It was described by Pascoe in 1865.
