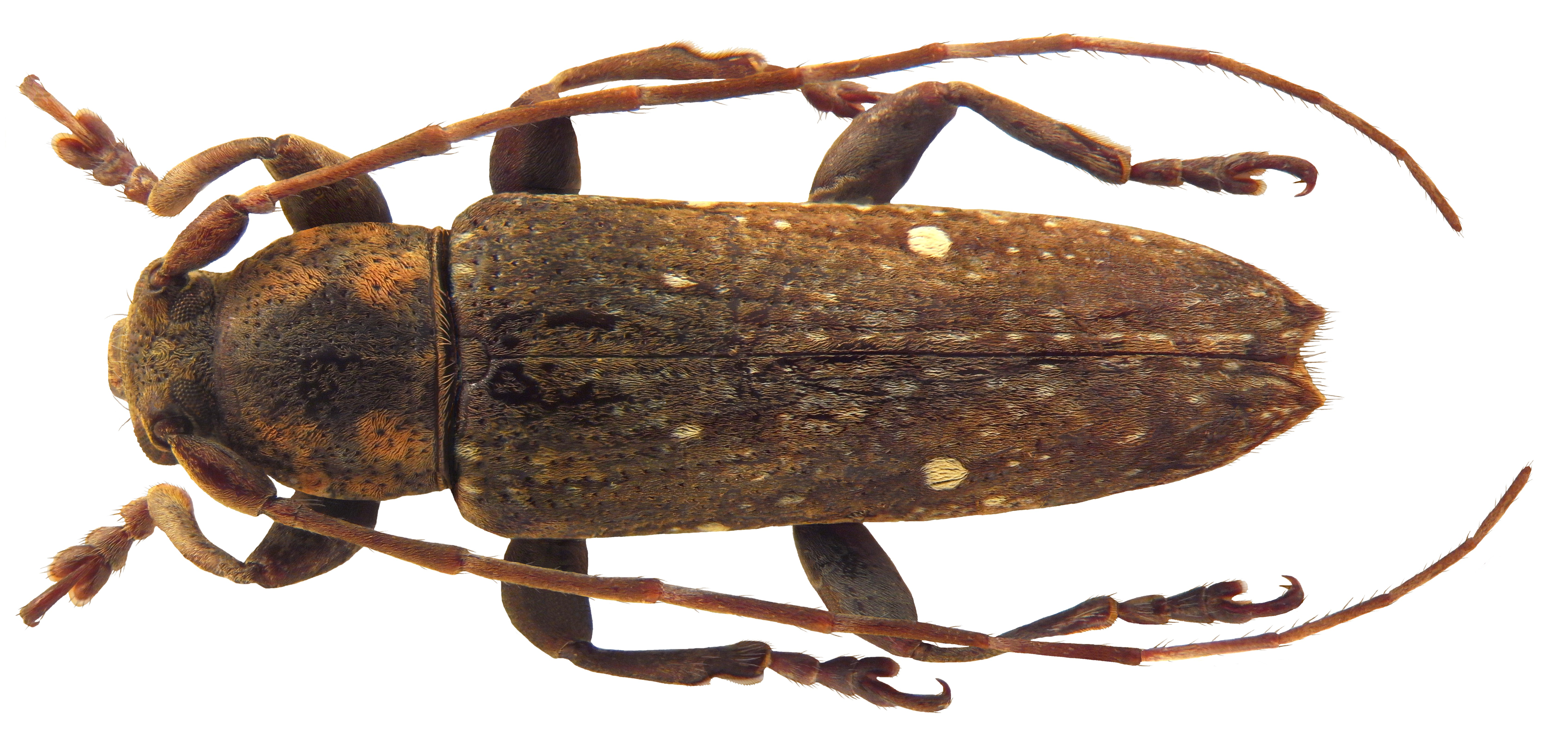

Scientific classification
- Domain: Eukaryota
- Kingdom: Animalia
- Phylum: Arthropoda
- Class: Insecta
- Order: Coleoptera
- Suborder: Polyphaga
- Infraorder: Cucujiformia
- Family: Cerambycidae
- Genus: Sybra
- Species: S. maculicollis

Binomial name
- Sybra maculicollis Aurivillius, 1927

Synonyms
- Sybra assimilis Breuning, 1939; Sybra biguttulata Breuning, 1964

= Sybra maculicollis =

Species of beetle

Sybra maculicollis is a species of beetle in the family Cerambycidae described by Per Olof Christopher Aurivillius in 1927.
