= Sybra rouyeri =

Scientific classification
- Kingdom: Animalia
- Phylum: Arthropoda
- Clade: Pancrustacea
- Class: Insecta
- Order: Coleoptera
- Suborder: Polyphaga
- Infraorder: Cucujiformia
- Family: Cerambycidae
- Genus: Sybra
- Species: S. rouyeri

Binomial name
- Sybra rouyeri Pic, 1938

Species of beetle

Sybra rouyeri is a species of beetle in the family Cerambycidae. It was described by Maurice Pic in 1938. It is known from Borneo and Java.
