= Sybra quinquevittata =

Scientific classification
- Kingdom: Animalia
- Phylum: Arthropoda
- Class: Insecta
- Order: Coleoptera
- Suborder: Polyphaga
- Infraorder: Cucujiformia
- Family: Cerambycidae
- Genus: Sybra
- Species: S. quinquevittata

Binomial name
- Sybra quinquevittata Breuning, 1942

Species of beetle

Sybra quinquevittata is a species of beetle in the family Cerambycidae. It was described by Breuning in 1942. It is known from Borneo and Malaysia.
