= Sybra trilineata =

Scientific classification
- Kingdom: Animalia
- Phylum: Arthropoda
- Class: Insecta
- Order: Coleoptera
- Suborder: Polyphaga
- Infraorder: Cucujiformia
- Family: Cerambycidae
- Genus: Sybra
- Species: S. trilineata

Binomial name
- Sybra trilineata Pic, 1938

Species of beetle

Sybra trilineata is a species of beetle in the family Cerambycidae that was described by Maurice Pic in 1938.
