= Sybra flavostriata =

Scientific classification
- Kingdom: Animalia
- Phylum: Arthropoda
- Class: Insecta
- Order: Coleoptera
- Suborder: Polyphaga
- Infraorder: Cucujiformia
- Family: Cerambycidae
- Genus: Sybra
- Species: S. flavostriata

Binomial name
- Sybra flavostriata Hayashi, 1968

Species of beetle

Sybra flavostriata is a species of beetle in the family Cerambycidae. It was described by Hayashi in 1968.
