= Sybra lingafelteri =

Scientific classification
- Domain: Eukaryota
- Kingdom: Animalia
- Phylum: Arthropoda
- Class: Insecta
- Order: Coleoptera
- Suborder: Polyphaga
- Infraorder: Cucujiformia
- Family: Cerambycidae
- Genus: Sybra
- Species: S. lingafelteri

Binomial name
- Sybra lingafelteri Skale & Weigel, 2012

Synonyms
- Mimosybra luzonica Breuning, 1957 nec Breuning, 1939

Species of beetle

Sybra lingafelteri is a species of beetle in the family Cerambycidae. It was described by Skale and Weigel in 2012.
