= Sybra furtiva =

Scientific classification
- Domain: Eukaryota
- Kingdom: Animalia
- Phylum: Arthropoda
- Class: Insecta
- Order: Coleoptera
- Suborder: Polyphaga
- Infraorder: Cucujiformia
- Family: Cerambycidae
- Genus: Sybra
- Species: S. furtiva

Binomial name
- Sybra furtiva Pascoe, 1865

Species of beetle

Sybra furtiva is a species of beetle, that belongs to the family of Cerambycidae. It was described by Pascoe in 1865.
