= Sybra mimogeminata =

Scientific classification
- Kingdom: Animalia
- Phylum: Arthropoda
- Class: Insecta
- Order: Coleoptera
- Suborder: Polyphaga
- Infraorder: Cucujiformia
- Family: Cerambycidae
- Genus: Sybra
- Species: S. mimogeminata

Binomial name
- Sybra mimogeminata Breuning & Ohbayashi, 1964

Species of beetle

Sybra mimogeminata is a species of beetle in the family Cerambycidae. It was described by Stephan von Breuning and Ohbayashi in 1964. It contains two subspecies, Sybra mimogeminata carinatipennis and Sybra mimogeminata mimogeminata.
