= Sybra simalurica =

Scientific classification
- Kingdom: Animalia
- Phylum: Arthropoda
- Class: Insecta
- Order: Coleoptera
- Suborder: Polyphaga
- Infraorder: Cucujiformia
- Family: Cerambycidae
- Genus: Sybra
- Species: S. simalurica

Binomial name
- Sybra simalurica Breuning & de Jong, 1941

Species of beetle

Sybra simalurica is a species of beetle in the family Cerambycidae. It was described by Stephan von Breuning and de Jong in 1941. Larvae of this species drill into wood, which can cause damage to live wood or logs.
