= Sybra fuscofasciatoides =

Scientific classification
- Kingdom: Animalia
- Phylum: Arthropoda
- Class: Insecta
- Order: Coleoptera
- Suborder: Polyphaga
- Infraorder: Cucujiformia
- Family: Cerambycidae
- Genus: Sybra
- Species: S. fuscofasciatoides

Binomial name
- Sybra fuscofasciatoides Breuning, 1964

Synonyms
- Eoopsis fuscofasciatus Dillon & Dillon, 1952

Species of beetle

Sybra fuscofasciatoides is a species of beetle in the family Cerambycidae. It was described by Breuning in 1964.
