= Sybra puncticollis =

Scientific classification
- Domain: Eukaryota
- Kingdom: Animalia
- Phylum: Arthropoda
- Class: Insecta
- Order: Coleoptera
- Suborder: Polyphaga
- Infraorder: Cucujiformia
- Family: Cerambycidae
- Genus: Sybra
- Species: S. puncticollis

Binomial name
- Sybra puncticollis (Pascoe, 1865)

Species of beetle

Sybra puncticollis is a species of beetle in the family Cerambycidae. It was described by Pascoe in 1865.
