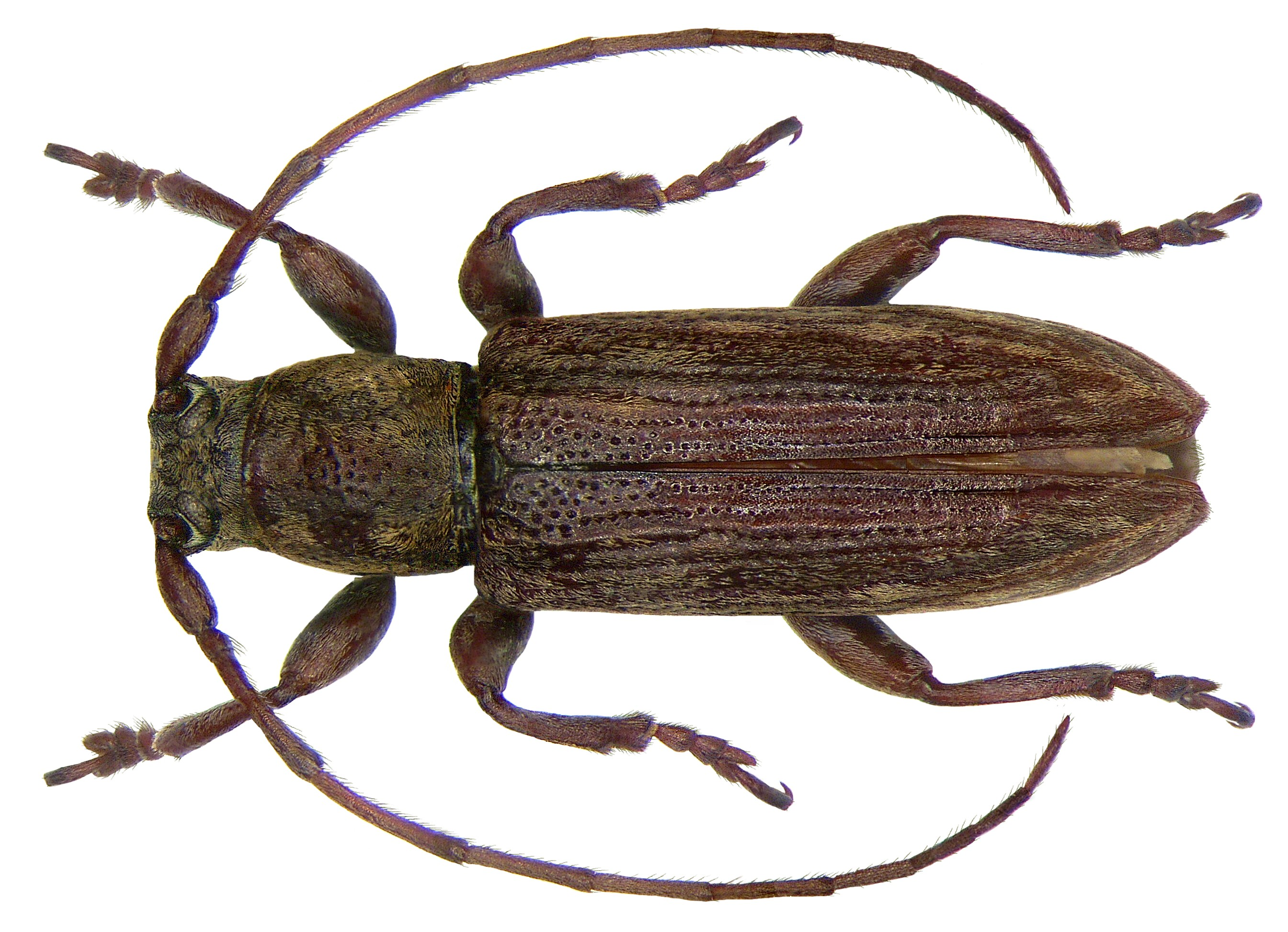
- Sybra aequabilis

Scientific classification
- Domain: Eukaryota
- Kingdom: Animalia
- Phylum: Arthropoda
- Class: Insecta
- Order: Coleoptera
- Suborder: Polyphaga
- Infraorder: Cucujiformia
- Family: Cerambycidae
- Subfamily: Lamiinae
- Tribe: Apomecynini
- Genus: Sybra; Pascoe, 1865

Type species
- Ropica stigmatica Pascoe, 1857

= Sybra =

Genus of beetles

Sybra is a genus of beetles in the family Cerambycidae, containing the following species:

== Subgenus ==
subgenus Cristosybra

- Sybra bifasciculosa Breuning, 1956
- Sybra cristipennis Breuning, 1950

subgenus Fasciculosybra

- Sybra ephippiata (Fairmaire, 1896)

subgenus Microzotale

- Sybra distincta Takakuwa, 1984
- Sybra uenoi (Hayashi, 1956)

subgenus Pilosybra

- Sybra pallens Breuning, 1942

subgenus Pseudathelais

- Sybra concolor Breuning, 1982
- Sybra longicollis Breuning, 1968
- Sybra paralongicollis Breuning, 1968

subgenus Sybra

- Sybra dimidiata (Dillon & Dillon, 1952)
- Sybra eson (Dillon & Dillon, 1952)
- Sybra puella (Dillon & Dillon, 1952)
- Sybra sapho (Dillon & Dillon, 1952)
- Sybra syces (Dillon & Dillon, 1952)
- Sybra acuta (Pascoe, 1863)
- Sybra acutipennis Breuning, 1951
- Sybra aenescens Breuning, 1939
- Sybra aequabilis Breuning, 1938
- Sybra affinis Breuning, 1939
- Sybra albescens Breuning, 1953
- Sybra albisparsa Breuning, 1939
- Sybra albolineata Breuning, 1939
- Sybra albomaculata Breuning, 1939
- Sybra albopunctata Breuning, 1939
- Sybra alboscutellaris (Heller, 1924)
- Sybra albostictica Breuning, 1960
- Sybra albostictipennis Breuning, 1963
- Sybra albosuturalis Breuning, 1939
- Sybra albovariegata Breuning, 1939
- Sybra albovittata Breuning, 1943
- Sybra alternans (Wiedemann, 1823)
- Sybra alternata Breuning, 1939
- Sybra ambigua Breuning, 1939
- Sybra anatahana Gressitt, 1956
- Sybra andamanensis Breuning, 1939
- Sybra andamanica Breuning, 1939
- Sybra annulata (Heller, 1924)
- Sybra apicalis Breuning, 1939
- Sybra apicefusca Breuning, 1950
- Sybra apicemaculata Breuning, 1939
- Sybra apiceochreomaculata Breuning, 1964
- Sybra apicesignata Breuning & de Jong, 1941
- Sybra apicespinosa Breuning, 1942
- Sybra apicevittata Breuning, 1939
- Sybra apomecynoides Breuning, 1939
- Sybra approximata Breuning, 1939
- Sybra arator Pascoe, 1865
- Sybra arcifera Pascoe, 1865
- Sybra auberti Breuning, 1950
- Sybra baculina Bates, 1866
- Sybra baloghi Breuning, 1975
- Sybra basialbofasciata Hayashi, 1972
- Sybra basicristata Breuning, 1939
- Sybra basilana Breuning, 1939
- Sybra basimaculata (Heller, 1924)
- Sybra basirufa Breuning, 1970
- Sybra benjamini Breuning, 1939
- Sybra bialbomaculata Breuning, 1953
- Sybra biangulata (Fairmaire, 1893)
- Sybra biapicata (Gahan, 1907)
- Sybra biatrosignata Aurivillius, 1927
- Sybra bicristata Breuning, 1939
- Sybra bicristipennis Breuning, 1961
- Sybra biflavoguttata Breuning, 1953
- Sybra bifuscomaculata Breuning, 1960
- Sybra bifuscoplagiata Breuning, 1940
- Sybra bifuscoplagiatipennis Breuning, 1966
- Sybra bifuscopunctata Breuning, 1960
- Sybra biguttata Aurivillius, 1927
- Sybra biguttula Breuning, 1964
- Sybra bimaculata Breuning, 1939
- Sybra binigromaculata Breuning, 1973
- Sybra binotata Gahan, 1907
- Sybra biochreopunctipennis Breuning, 1966
- Sybra bioculata Pic, 1925
- Sybra bipartita Breuning, 1939
- Sybra bipunctata (Heller, 1924)
- Sybra bipunctulata Breuning, 1966
- Sybra bisignata Schwarzer, 1931
- Sybra bisignatoides Breuning, 1980
- Sybra borchmanni Breuning, 1957
- Sybra borneotica Breuning, 1939
- Sybra botelensis Breuning & Ohbayashi, 1966
- Sybra breuningi Gressitt, 1940
- Sybra brevelineata (Pic, 1926)
- Sybra brunnescens Breuning, 1950
- Sybra buruensis Breuning, 1939
- Sybra cana Breuning, 1939
- Sybra canoides Breuning, 1980
- Sybra carinata Breuning, 1939
- Sybra carinipennis Breuning, 1956
- Sybra catalana Gressitt, 1956
- Sybra catopa Dillon & Dillon, 1952
- Sybra chaffanjoni Breuning, 1969
- Sybra chamorro Gressitt, 1956
- Sybra cinerascens Breuning, 1940
- Sybra cinerea Aurivillius, 1927
- Sybra citrina Breuning, 1950
- Sybra clara Breuning, 1939
- Sybra collaris Pascoe, 1865
- Sybra conicollis Aurivillius, 1927
- Sybra connexa Pascoe, 1865
- Sybra consobrina Gressitt, 1956
- Sybra consputa Pascoe, 1865
- Sybra constricticollis Aurivillius, 1927
- Sybra contigua Pascoe, 1865
- Sybra continentalis Breuning, 1942
- Sybra convexa Gressitt, 1956
- Sybra coomani Breuning, 1939
- Sybra crassepuncta Breuning, 1938
- Sybra cretifera Pascoe, 1865
- Sybra curvatosignata Breuning & de Jong, 1941
- Sybra cylindraceoides Breuning, 1970
- Sybra dawsoni Breuning, 1970
- Sybra demarzi Breuning, 1963
- Sybra densemarmorata Breuning, 1942
- Sybra densepunctata Breuning, 1940
- Sybra densestictica Breuning, 1939
- Sybra deserta (Heller, 1924)
- Sybra desueta Pascoe, 1865
- Sybra devota Pascoe, 1865
- Sybra discomaculata Breuning, 1950
- Sybra dohertyi Breuning, 1960
- Sybra donckieri Breuning, 1939
- Sybra dorsata (Fairmaire, 1881)
- Sybra dorsatoides Breuning, 1957
- Sybra drescheri Fisher, 1936
- Sybra dunni Breuning, 1976
- Sybra egregia Pascoe, 1865
- Sybra elongatissima Breuning, 1939
- Sybra elongatula Breuning, 1939
- Sybra emarginata Gressitt, 1956
- Sybra epilystoides Breuning & de Jong, 1941
- Sybra erratica Pascoe, 1865
- Sybra eumilis (Dillon & Dillon, 1952)
- Sybra excavatipennis Breuning, 1960
- Sybra fauveli (Théry, 1897)
- Sybra femoralis Breuning, 1940
- Sybra fervida Pascoe, 1865
- Sybra filiformis Breuning, 1939
- Sybra flava Breuning, 1939
- Sybra flavoapicalis Breuning, 1939
- Sybra flavoguttata Aurivillius, 1927
- Sybra flavoides Breuning, 1964
- Sybra flavolineata Breuning, 1942
- Sybra flavomaculata Breuning, 1939
- Sybra flavomarmorata Breuning, 1942
- Sybra flavostictica Breuning, 1942
- Sybra flavostriata Hayashi, 1968
- Sybra fortipes Breuning, 1964
- Sybra fortiscapa Breuning, 1942
- Sybra frasersi Breuning, 1976
- Sybra freyi Breuning, 1957
- Sybra fulvoapicalis (Dillon & Dillon, 1952)
- Sybra furtiva Pascoe, 1865
- Sybra fusca Breuning, 1970
- Sybra fuscoapicalis Breuning, 1939
- Sybra fuscoapicaloides Breuning, 1964
- Sybra fuscofasciata Breuning, 1939
- Sybra fuscofasciatoides Breuning, 1964
- Sybra fuscolateralipennis Breuning, 1964
- Sybra fuscolateralis Breuning, 1939
- Sybra fuscomarmorata Breuning, 1939
- Sybra fuscopicta Breuning, 1940
- Sybra fuscosternalis Breuning, 1942
- Sybra fuscosuturalis Breuning, 1939
- Sybra fuscotriangularis Breuning, 1939
- Sybra fuscovitticollis Breuning, 1970
- Sybra fuscovittipennis Breuning, 1975
- Sybra geminata (Klug, 1833)
- Sybra geminatoides Breuning, 1940
- Sybra grisea Breuning, 1939
- Sybra griseola Breuning, 1939
- Sybra griseopubescens Breuning, 1956
- Sybra grisescens Breuning, 1939
- Sybra guamensis Breuning, 1976
- Sybra guttula Breuning, 1939
- Sybra hebridarum Breuning, 1939
- Sybra helleri (Schwarzer, 1931)
- Sybra holoflavogrisea Breuning, 1973
- Sybra humeralis Aurivillius, 1927
- Sybra humerosa Breuning, 1939
- Sybra iconica Pascoe, 1865
- Sybra iconicoides Breuning, 1975
- Sybra ignobilis Breuning, 1942
- Sybra inanis Pascoe, 1865
- Sybra incana (Pascoe, 1859)
- Sybra incaniformis Breuning, 1954
- Sybra incivilis (Pascoe, 1863)
- Sybra indistincta Breuning, 1939
- Sybra inermis (Pic, 1944)
- Sybra internata Pascoe, 1865
- Sybra intorta Breuning, 1939
- Sybra ishigakii Breuning & Ohbayashi, 1964
- Sybra jaguarita Breuning, 1942
- Sybra javana Breuning, 1939
- Sybra javanica Breuning, 1939
- Sybra kaszabi Breuning, 1969
- Sybra kaszabiana Breuning, 1977
- Sybra kuri Ohbayashi & Hayashi, 1962
- Sybra laetula Breuning, 1939
- Sybra laevepunctata Breuning, 1939
- Sybra latefasciata Breuning, 1939
- Sybra lateralis Breuning, 1942
- Sybra laterialba Breuning, 1939
- Sybra laterifusca Breuning, 1939
- Sybra laterifuscipennis Breuning, 1964
- Sybra laterivitta Breuning, 1940
- Sybra latiuscula Aurivillius, 1927
- Sybra leucostictica Breuning, 1939
- Sybra lineata Pascoe, 1865
- Sybra lineatoides Breuning, 1973
- Sybra lineolata Breuning, 1942
- Sybra lingafelteri Skale & Weigel, 2012
- Sybra lobata Breuning, 1940
- Sybra lombokana Breuning, 1982
- Sybra longipes Breuning & de Jong, 1941
- Sybra longula Breuning, 1939
- Sybra luzonica Breuning, 1939
- Sybra maculiclunis Matsushita, 1931
- Sybra maculicollis Aurivillius, 1927
- Sybra maculithorax Breuning, 1939
- Sybra malaccensis Breuning, 1943
- Sybra marcida Pascoe, 1865
- Sybra marmorata Breuning, 1939
- Sybra marmorea Breuning, 1939
- Sybra mastersi Blackburn, 1894
- Sybra mausoni Breuning, 1969
- Sybra mediofasciata Breuning, 1939
- Sybra mediofusca Breuning, 1940
- Sybra medioguttata Breuning, 1942
- Sybra mediomaculata (Heller, 1924)
- Sybra mediovittata Breuning, 1939
- Sybra meeki Breuning, 1976
- Sybra mimalternans Breuning, 1970
- Sybra mimobaculina Breuning, 1970
- Sybra mimogeminata Breuning & Ohbayashi, 1964
- Sybra mindanaonis Breuning, 1939
- Sybra mindorensis Aurivillius, 1927
- Sybra minima Breuning, 1939
- Sybra minuta (Pic, 1927)
- Sybra minutior Breuning, 1939
- Sybra minutissima Breuning, 1943
- Sybra miscanthivola Makihara, 1977
- Sybra misella Breuning, 1939
- Sybra moczari Breuning, 1981
- Sybra modestior Breuning, 1960
- Sybra moorei (Gahan, 1894)
- Sybra multicoloripennis Breuning, 1971
- Sybra multiflavostriata Breuning, 1973
- Sybra multifuscofasciata Breuning, 1964
- Sybra murina Breuning, 1939
- Sybra narai Hayashi, 1976
- Sybra neopomeriana Breuning, 1939
- Sybra niasica Breuning, 1961
- Sybra nicobarica Breuning, 1939
- Sybra nigrobivittata Breuning, 1939
- Sybra nigrofasciata Aurivillius, 1927
- Sybra nigrolineata Breuning, 1942
- Sybra nigromarmorata Breuning, 1939
- Sybra nigroobliquelineata Breuning, 1943
- Sybra notatipennis Pascoe, 1865
- Sybra novaebritanniae Breuning, 1949
- Sybra nubila Pascoe, 1863
- Sybra obliquealbovittata Breuning, 1970
- Sybra obliquebifasciata Breuning, 1948
- Sybra obliquefasciata Breuning, 1938
- Sybra obliquelineata Breuning, 1942
- Sybra obliquelineaticollis Breuning, 1939
- Sybra obliquemaculata Breuning, 1942
- Sybra oblongipennis Breuning, 1939
- Sybra obtusipennis (Aurivillius, 1928)
- Sybra ochraceovittata Breuning, 1950
- Sybra ochreicollis Breuning, 1939
- Sybra ochreoguttata Breuning, 1939
- Sybra ochreosignata Breuning, 1939
- Sybra ochreosignatipennis Breuning, 1973
- Sybra ochreosparsa Breuning, 1939
- Sybra ochreosparsipennis Breuning, 1966
- Sybra ochreostictica Breuning, 1942
- Sybra ochreovittata Breuning, 1939
- Sybra ochreovittipennis Breuning, 1964
- Sybra odiosa Pascoe, 1865
- Sybra okinawana Breuning & Ohbayashi, 1970
- Sybra ordinata Bates, 1873
- Sybra oreora Gressitt, 1956
- Sybra ornata Breuning, 1939
- Sybra oshimana Breuning, 1958
- Sybra palavana Aurivillius, 1927
- Sybra palawanicola Breuning, 1960
- Sybra palliata Pascoe, 1865
- Sybra pallida Breuning, 1939
- Sybra pantherina Heller, 1915
- Sybra papuana Breuning, 1939
- Sybra parabisignatoides Breuning, 1980
- Sybra paraunicolor Breuning, 1975
- Sybra partefuscolateralis Breuning, 1964
- Sybra parteochreithorax Breuning, 1973
- Sybra parva Breuning, 1939
- Sybra parvula Breuning, 1939
- Sybra pascoei Lameere, 1893
- Sybra patruoides Breuning, 1939
- Sybra peraffinis Breuning, 1942
- Sybra pfanneri Breuning, 1976
- Sybra philippinensis Breuning, 1939
- Sybra piceomacula Gressitt, 1951
- Sybra picta Breuning, 1939
- Sybra plagiata Aurivillius, 1927
- Sybra plagiatoides Breuning, 1950
- Sybra pluriguttata Breuning, 1942
- Sybra plurilineata Breuning, 1942
- Sybra poeciloptera Aurivillius, 1917
- Sybra ponapensis Blair, 1942
- Sybra porcellus Pascoe, 1865
- Sybra postalbomaculata Breuning, 1964
- Sybra postalbomarmorata Breuning, 1964
- Sybra postbasicristata Breuning, 1974
- Sybra posticalis (Pascoe, 1858)
- Sybra postmaculata Breuning, 1939
- Sybra postscutellaremaculata Breuning, 1964
- Sybra postscutellaris Breuning, 1939
- Sybra praemediomaculata Breuning, 1943
- Sybra praeusta (Pascoe, 1859)
- Sybra preapicefasciata Breuning, 1953
- Sybra preapicefuscofasciata Breuning, 1964
- Sybra preapicemaculata Breuning, 1939
- Sybra preapicetriangularis Breuning, 1973
- Sybra primaria Pascoe, 1865
- Sybra propinqua Breuning, 1939
- Sybra proxima Breuning, 1939
- Sybra proximata Breuning, 1942
- Sybra pseudirrorata Breuning, 1939
- Sybra pseudobityle (Heller, 1924)
- Sybra pseudogeminata Breuning, 1939
- Sybra pseudolineata Breuning, 1942
- Sybra pseudomarmorata Breuning, 1940
- Sybra pseudosignata Breuning, 1939
- Sybra pulla Breuning, 1939
- Sybra pulverea Pascoe, 1865
- Sybra pulvereoides Breuning, 1939
- Sybra punctata Fisher, 1925
- Sybra punctatostriata Bates, 1866
- Sybra puncticollis (Pascoe, 1865)
- Sybra punctulicollis Breuning, 1960
- Sybra pusilla Breuning, 1939
- Sybra quadriguttata Aurivillius, 1927
- Sybra quadrimaculata Breuning, 1939
- Sybra quadriplagiata Breuning, 1939
- Sybra quadripunctata Breuning, 1939
- Sybra quadristicta Breuning & de Jong, 1941
- Sybra quinquevittata Breuning, 1942
- Sybra refecta Pascoe, 1865
- Sybra regalis Breuning, 1939
- Sybra repudiosa Pascoe, 1865
- Sybra roepstorffi Breuning, 1964
- Sybra rosacea Breuning, 1942
- Sybra rouyeri Pic, 1938
- Sybra rufa Breuning, 1943
- Sybra rufula Pascoe, 1865
- Sybra samarana Breuning, 1970
- Sybra sarawakensis Breuning, 1939
- Sybra savioi Pic, 1925
- Sybra scalaris Breuning, 1939
- Sybra schultzeana Breuning, 1963
- Sybra schultzei Breuning, 1960
- Sybra schurmanni Breuning, 1983
- Sybra scutellata Fisher, 1925
- Sybra semilunaris Breuning, 1939
- Sybra separanda Aurivillius, 1927
- Sybra seriata (Pascoe, 1867)
- Sybra sexguttata Breuning, 1939
- Sybra sibuyana Aurivillius, 1927
- Sybra signata (Perroud, 1855)
- Sybra signatipennis Fisher, 1927
- Sybra signatoides Breuning, 1939
- Sybra sikkimensis Breuning, 1939
- Sybra simalurica Breuning & de Jong, 1941
- Sybra similis Breuning, 1939
- Sybra singaporensis Breuning, 1973
- Sybra solida Gahan, 1907
- Sybra spinipennis Breuning, 1954
- Sybra spinosa Breuning, 1939
- Sybra stigmatica (Pascoe, 1859)
- Sybra stramentosa Breuning, 1939
- Sybra strandi Breuning, 1939
- Sybra strandiella Breuning, 1942
- Sybra striatipennis Breuning, 1939
- Sybra striatopunctata Breuning, 1939
- Sybra strigina Pascoe, 1865
- Sybra subbiguttula Breuning, 1964
- Sybra subbiguttulata Breuning, 1964
- Sybra subclara Breuning, 1954
- Sybra subdentaticeps (Pic, 1926)
- Sybra subfortipes Breuning, 1964
- Sybra subgeminata Breuning, 1939
- Sybra submodesta Breuning, 1970
- Sybra subpalawana Breuning, 1969
- Sybra subproximatoides Breuning & Villiers, 1983
- Sybra subrotundipennis Breuning, 1961
- Sybra subtesselata Breuning, 1960
- Sybra subunicolor Breuning, 1974
- Sybra subuniformis Pic, 1926
- Sybra sulcata (Aurivillius, 1928)
- Sybra sumatrana Breuning, 1939
- Sybra sumatrensis Breuning, 1943
- Sybra suturemaculata Breuning, 1939
- Sybra tamborensis Breuning, 1956
- Sybra terminata Breuning, 1939
- Sybra ternatensis Breuning, 1942
- Sybra trapezoidalis Breuning, 1940
- Sybra triangulifera Breuning, 1938
- Sybra trianguliferoides Breuning & Villiers, 1983
- Sybra tricoloripennis Breuning, 1961
- Sybra triflavomaculata Breuning, 1975
- Sybra trilineata Pic, 1938
- Sybra turneri Breuning, 1958
- Sybra umbratica Pascoe, 1865
- Sybra unicolor Breuning, 1939
- Sybra unicoloripennis Breuning, 1950
- Sybra unifasciata Fujimura, 1956
- Sybra uniformipennis Breuning, 1966
- Sybra uniformis Breuning, 1939
- Sybra uninigroguttata Breuning, 1973
- Sybra unipunctata Breuning, 1939
- Sybra vadoni Breuning, 1970
- Sybra varians Breuning, 1939
- Sybra variefasciata Breuning, 1973
- Sybra varipennis Breuning, 1942
- Sybra venosa Pascoe, 1865
- Sybra violata Pascoe, 1865
- Sybra violatoides Breuning, 1975
- Sybra vittaticollis Aurivillius, 1927
- Sybra vitticollis Breuning & de Jong, 1941
- Sybra yokoi Skale & Weigel, 2014
- Sybra zebra Breuning, 1942

subgenus Sybrodiboma

- Sybra mikurensis Hayashi, 1969
- Sybra subfasciata (Bates, 1884)

subgenus incertae sedis

- Sybra herbacea Pascoe, 1865
