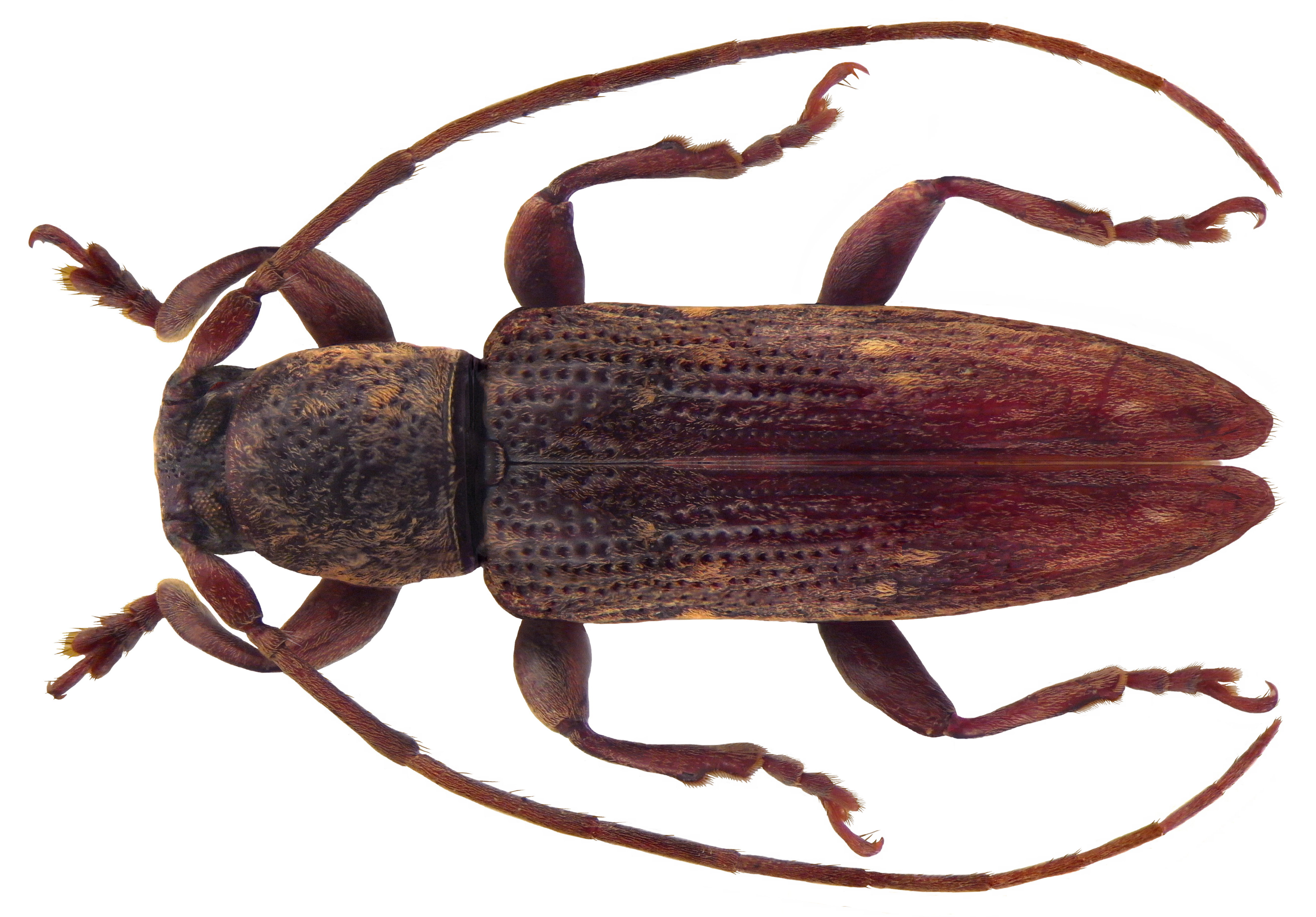

Scientific classification
- Kingdom: Animalia
- Phylum: Arthropoda
- Clade: Pancrustacea
- Class: Insecta
- Order: Coleoptera
- Suborder: Polyphaga
- Infraorder: Cucujiformia
- Family: Cerambycidae
- Genus: Sybra
- Species: S. inanis

Binomial name
- Sybra inanis Pascoe, 1865

Synonyms
- Sybra irrorata Pascoe, 1865; Sybra patrua Pascoe, 1865

= Sybra inanis =

Species of beetle

Sybra inanis is a species of longhorn beetle in the family Cerambycidae. It was described by Francis Polkinghorne Pascoe in 1865.
