= Sybra inermis =

Scientific classification
- Kingdom: Animalia
- Phylum: Arthropoda
- Class: Insecta
- Order: Coleoptera
- Suborder: Polyphaga
- Infraorder: Cucujiformia
- Family: Cerambycidae
- Genus: Sybra
- Species: S. inermis

Binomial name
- Sybra inermis (Pic, 1944)

Species of beetle

Sybra inermis is a species of beetle in the family Cerambycidae. It was described by Maurice Pic in 1944.
