= Sybra bioculata =

Scientific classification
- Kingdom: Animalia
- Phylum: Arthropoda
- Class: Insecta
- Order: Coleoptera
- Suborder: Polyphaga
- Infraorder: Cucujiformia
- Family: Cerambycidae
- Genus: Sybra
- Species: S. bioculata

Binomial name
- Sybra bioculata Pic, 1925

Species of beetle

Sybra bioculata is a species of beetle in the family Cerambycidae. It was described by Maurice Pic in 1925. It contains four subspecies: Sybra bioculata bioculata, Sybra bioculata quadrinotata, Sybra bioculata sikkimana, and Sybra bioculata tigrina.
