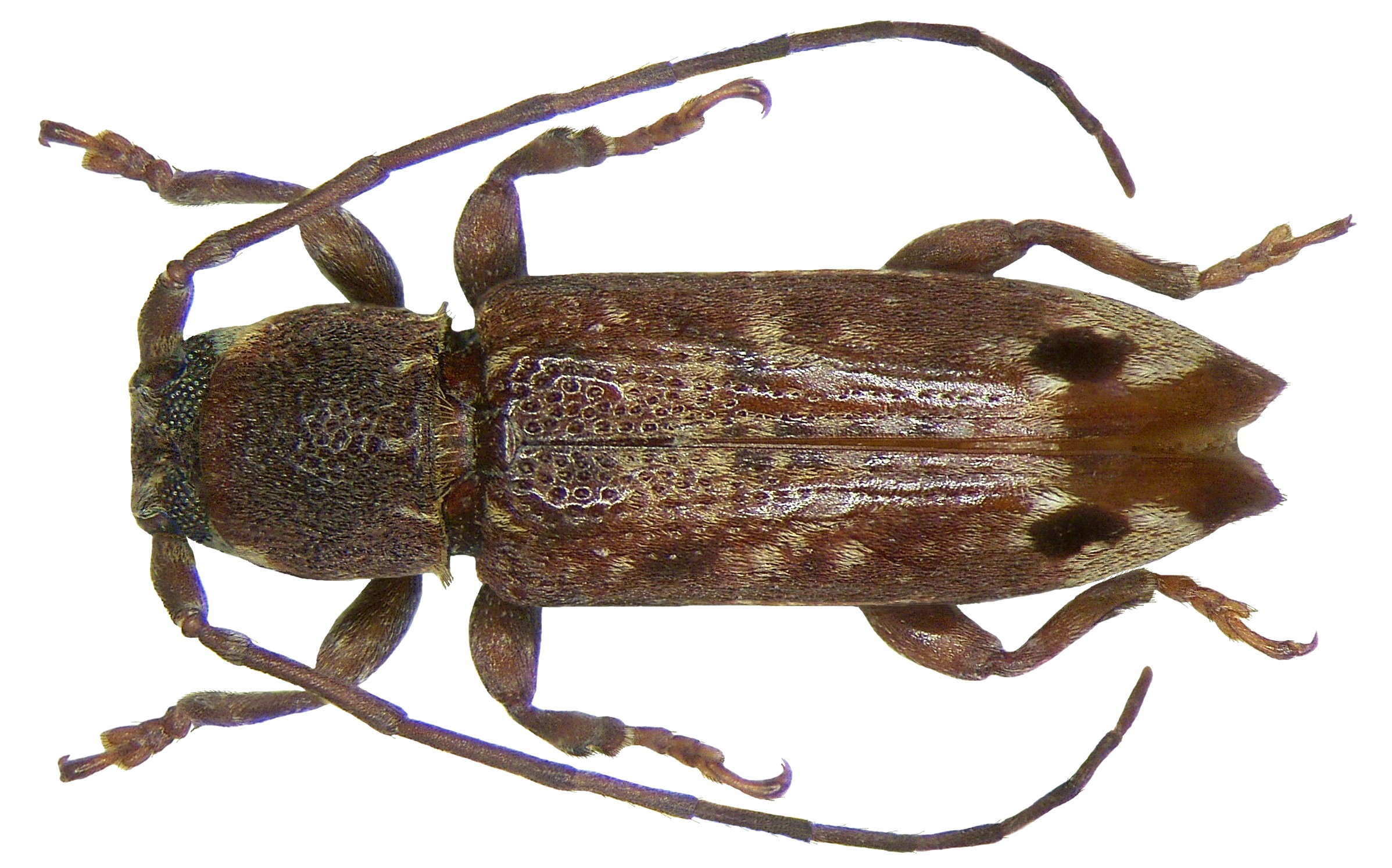

Scientific classification
- Domain: Eukaryota
- Kingdom: Animalia
- Phylum: Arthropoda
- Class: Insecta
- Order: Coleoptera
- Suborder: Polyphaga
- Infraorder: Cucujiformia
- Family: Cerambycidae
- Genus: Sybra
- Species: S. rufula

Binomial name
- Sybra rufula Pascoe, 1865

= Sybra rufula =

Species of beetle

Sybra rufula is a species of beetle in the family Cerambycidae. It was described by Pascoe in 1865.
