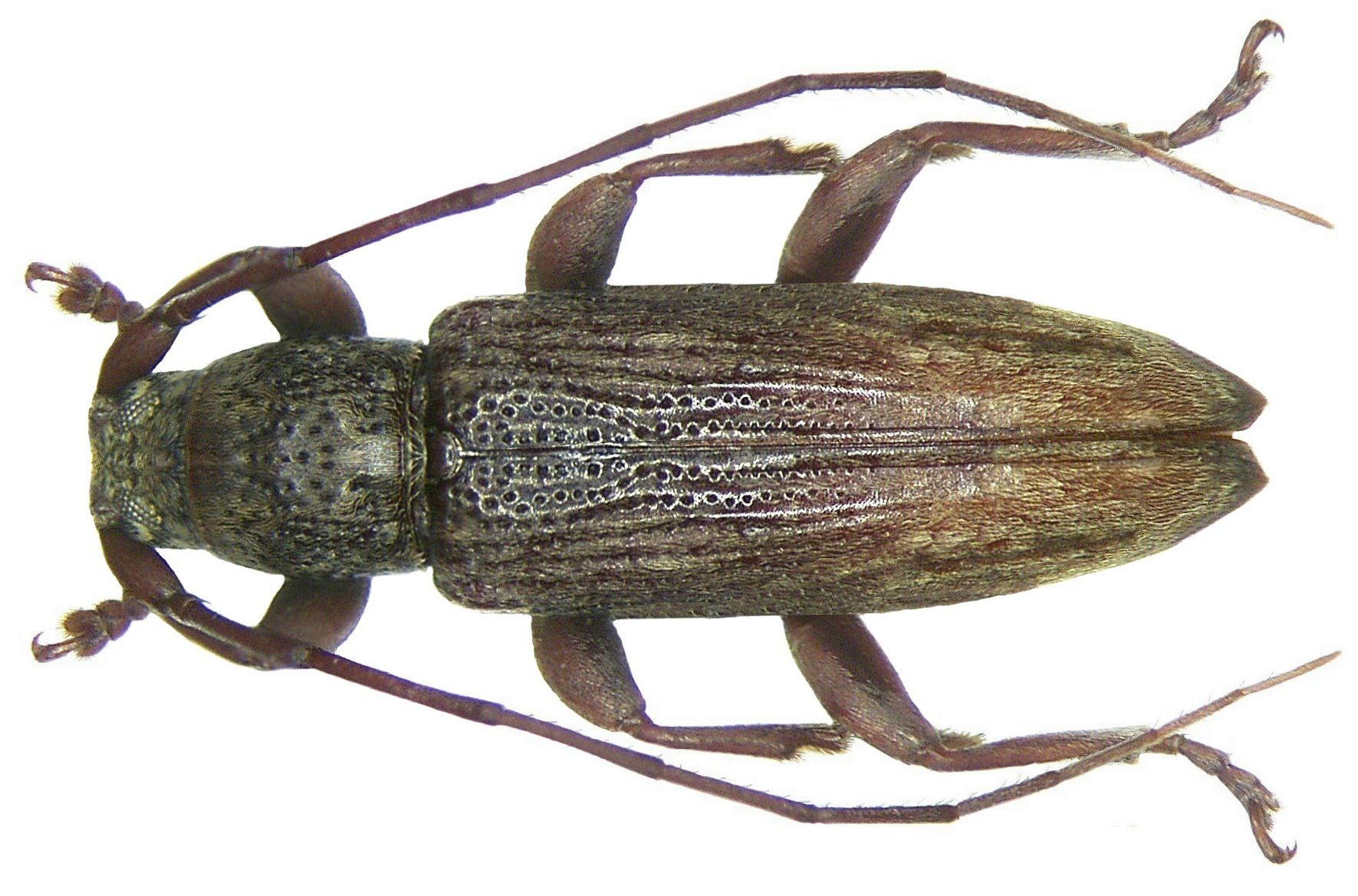

Scientific classification
- Domain: Eukaryota
- Kingdom: Animalia
- Phylum: Arthropoda
- Class: Insecta
- Order: Coleoptera
- Suborder: Polyphaga
- Infraorder: Cucujiformia
- Family: Cerambycidae
- Genus: Sybra
- Species: S. umbratica

Binomial name
- Sybra umbratica Pascoe, 1865

Synonyms
- Sybra albertisi Breuning, 1939; Sybra bitriangularis Breuning, 1953; Sybra flavipennis Breuning, 1942; Sybra lineatipennis Breuning, 1939; Sybra petulans Pascoe, 1865

= Sybra umbratica =

Species of beetle

Sybra umbratica is a species of beetle in the family Cerambycidae. It was described by Francis Polkinghorne Pascoe in 1865.

== Subspecies ==
- Sybra umbratica alorensis Breuning, 1956
- Sybra umbratica flavescens Breuning, 1948
- Sybra umbratica umbratica Pascoe, 1865
