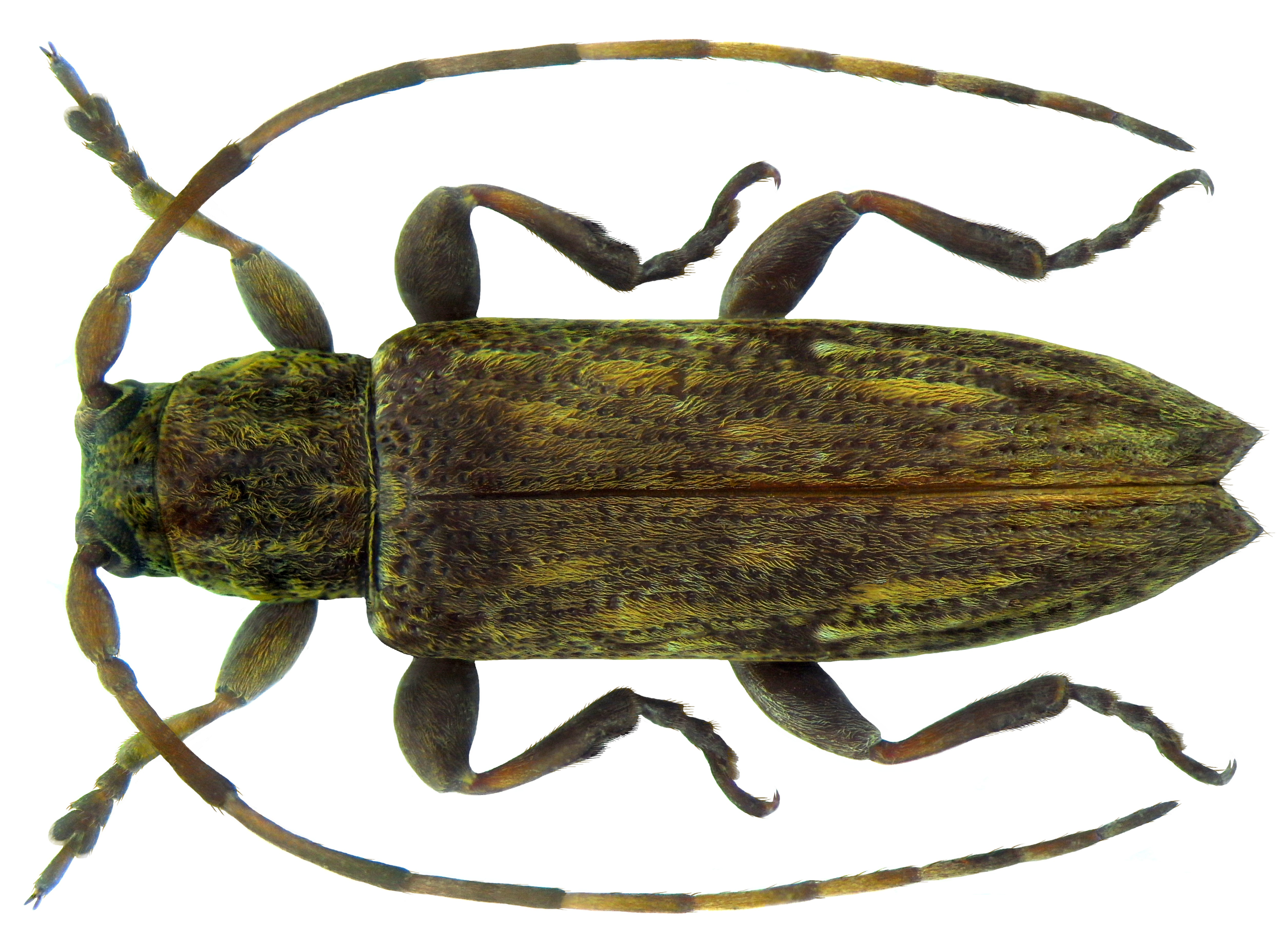

Scientific classification
- Domain: Eukaryota
- Kingdom: Animalia
- Phylum: Arthropoda
- Class: Insecta
- Order: Coleoptera
- Suborder: Polyphaga
- Infraorder: Cucujiformia
- Family: Cerambycidae
- Genus: Sybra
- Species: S. ordinata

Binomial name
- Sybra ordinata Bates, 1873

= Sybra ordinata =

Species of beetle

Sybra ordinata is a species of beetle in the family Cerambycidae. It was described by Henry Walter Bates in 1873.

== Subspecies ==
- Sybra ordinata flavostriata Hayashi, 1968
- Sybra ordinata loochooana Breuning, 1939
- Sybra ordinata miyakojimana Hayashi, 1972
- Sybra ordinata okinoerabuensis Hayashi, 1972
- Sybra ordinata ordinata Bates, 1873
- Sybra ordinata subtesselata Breuning, 1960
- Sybra ordinata tokara Hayashi, 1956
