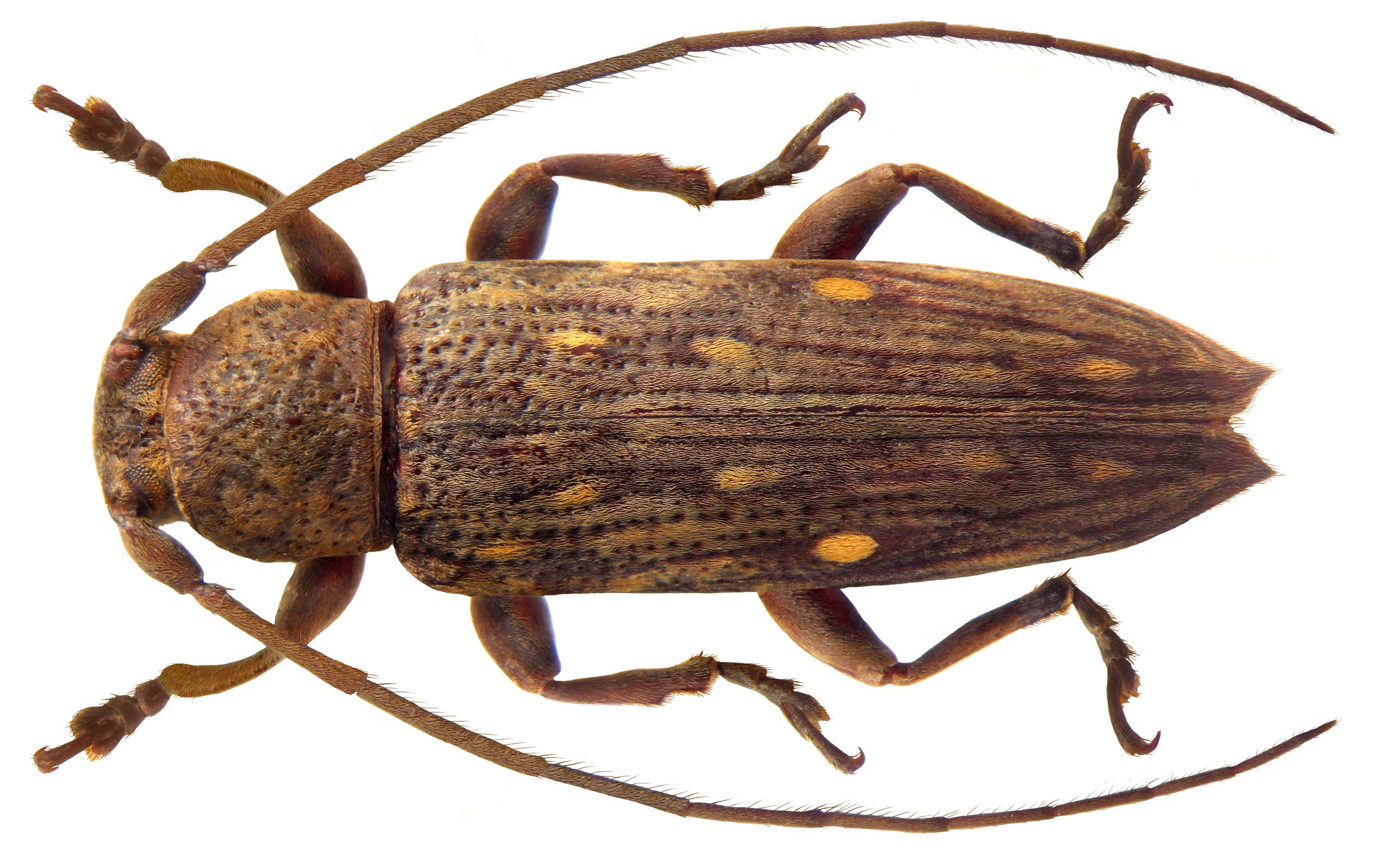

Scientific classification
- Domain: Eukaryota
- Kingdom: Animalia
- Phylum: Arthropoda
- Class: Insecta
- Order: Coleoptera
- Suborder: Polyphaga
- Infraorder: Cucujiformia
- Family: Cerambycidae
- Genus: Sybra
- Species: S. flavoguttata

Binomial name
- Sybra flavoguttata Aurivillius, 1927

Synonyms
- Sybra biguttulata samarensis Breuning, 1964; Sybra biochreoguttata Breuning, 1964; Sybra flavoguttata flavoguttata (Aurivillius) Breuning, 1970

= Sybra flavoguttata =

Species of beetle

Sybra flavoguttata is a species of beetle in the family Cerambycidae. It was described by Per Olof Christopher Aurivillius in 1927 and is known from the Philippines.
