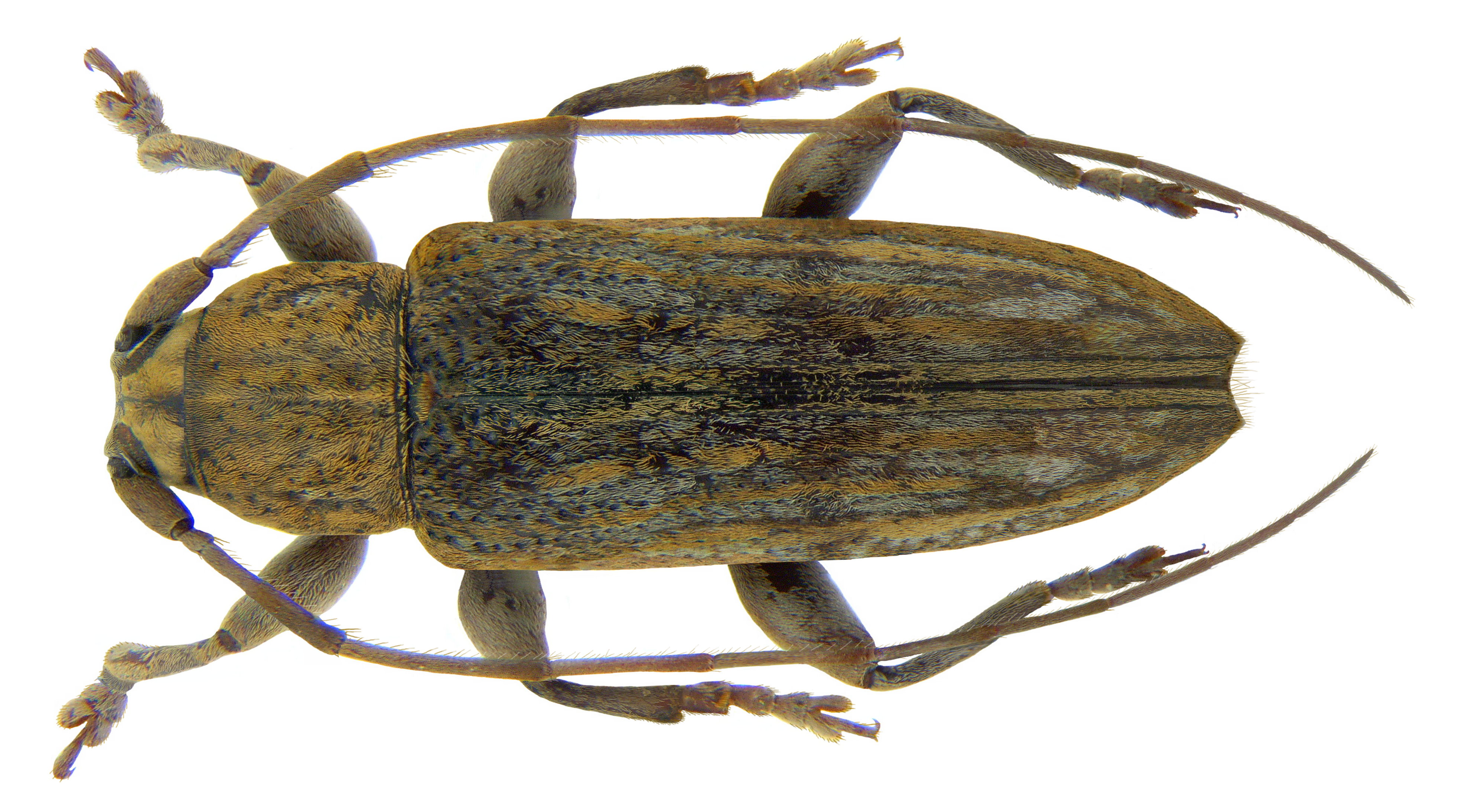

Scientific classification
- Kingdom: Animalia
- Phylum: Arthropoda
- Clade: Pancrustacea
- Class: Insecta
- Order: Coleoptera
- Suborder: Polyphaga
- Infraorder: Cucujiformia
- Family: Cerambycidae
- Genus: Sybra
- Species: S. primaria

Binomial name
- Sybra primaria Pascoe, 1865

Synonyms
- Sybra binigromaculipennis Breuning, 1938; Sybra celebensis Breuning, 1939; Sybra keyensis Breuning, 1939; Sybra pseudalternans Breuning, 1939

= Sybra primaria =

Species of beetle

Sybra primaria is a species of beetle in the family Cerambycidae. It was described by Francis Polkinghorne Pascoe in 1865. It is known from Malaysia, Moluccas, and Sulawesi.
