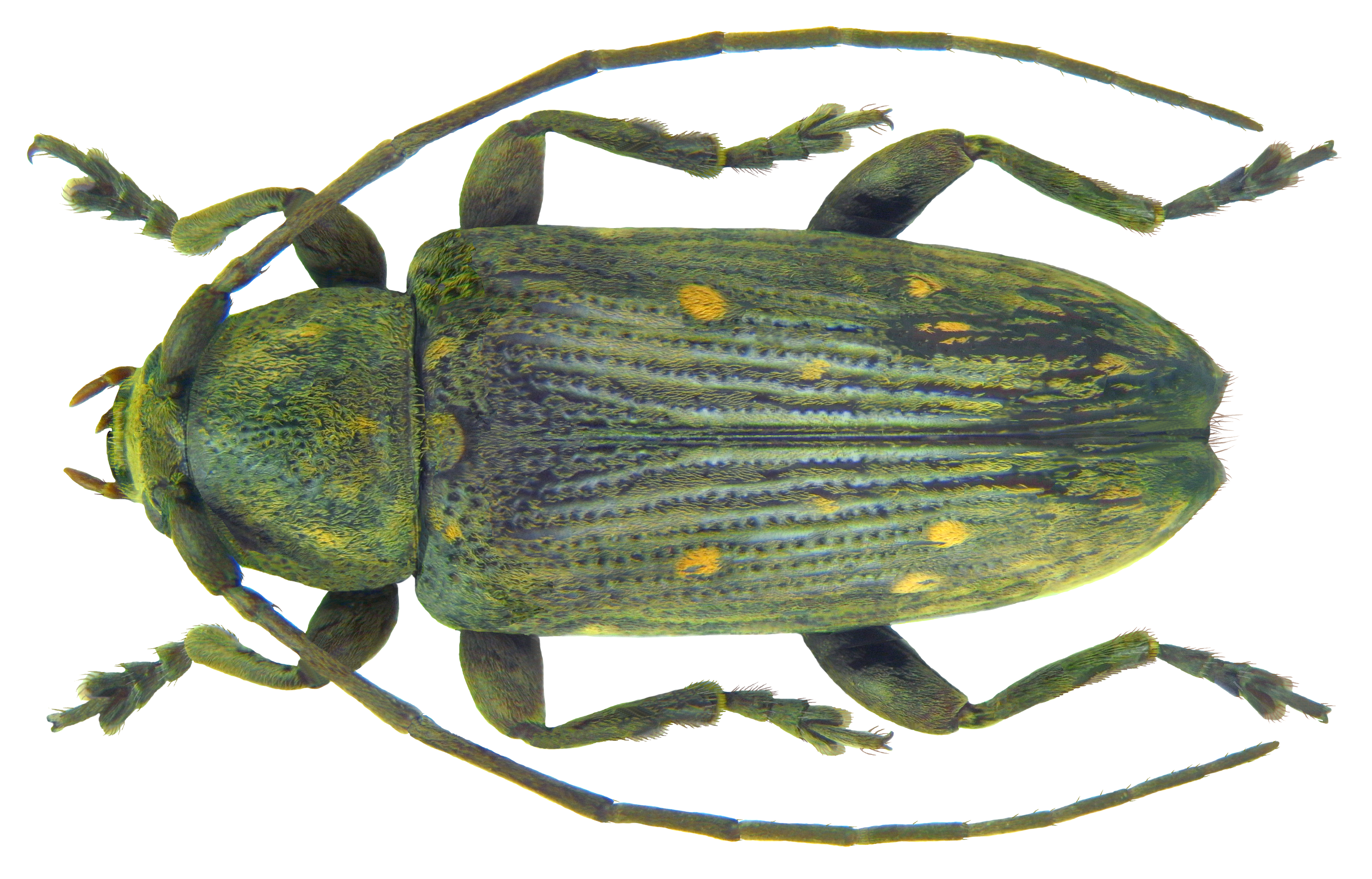

Scientific classification
- Kingdom: Animalia
- Phylum: Arthropoda
- Class: Insecta
- Order: Coleoptera
- Suborder: Polyphaga
- Infraorder: Cucujiformia
- Family: Cerambycidae
- Genus: Sybra
- Species: S. strigina

Binomial name
- Sybra strigina Pascoe, 1865

Synonyms
- Ropica decemmaculata Breuning, 1965; Sybra decemmaculata Breuning, 1965; Sybra patrua m. strigina (Pascoe)

= Sybra strigina =

Species of beetle

Sybra strigina is a species of beetle in the family Cerambycidae. It was described by Pascoe in 1865. It is known from Moluccas.
