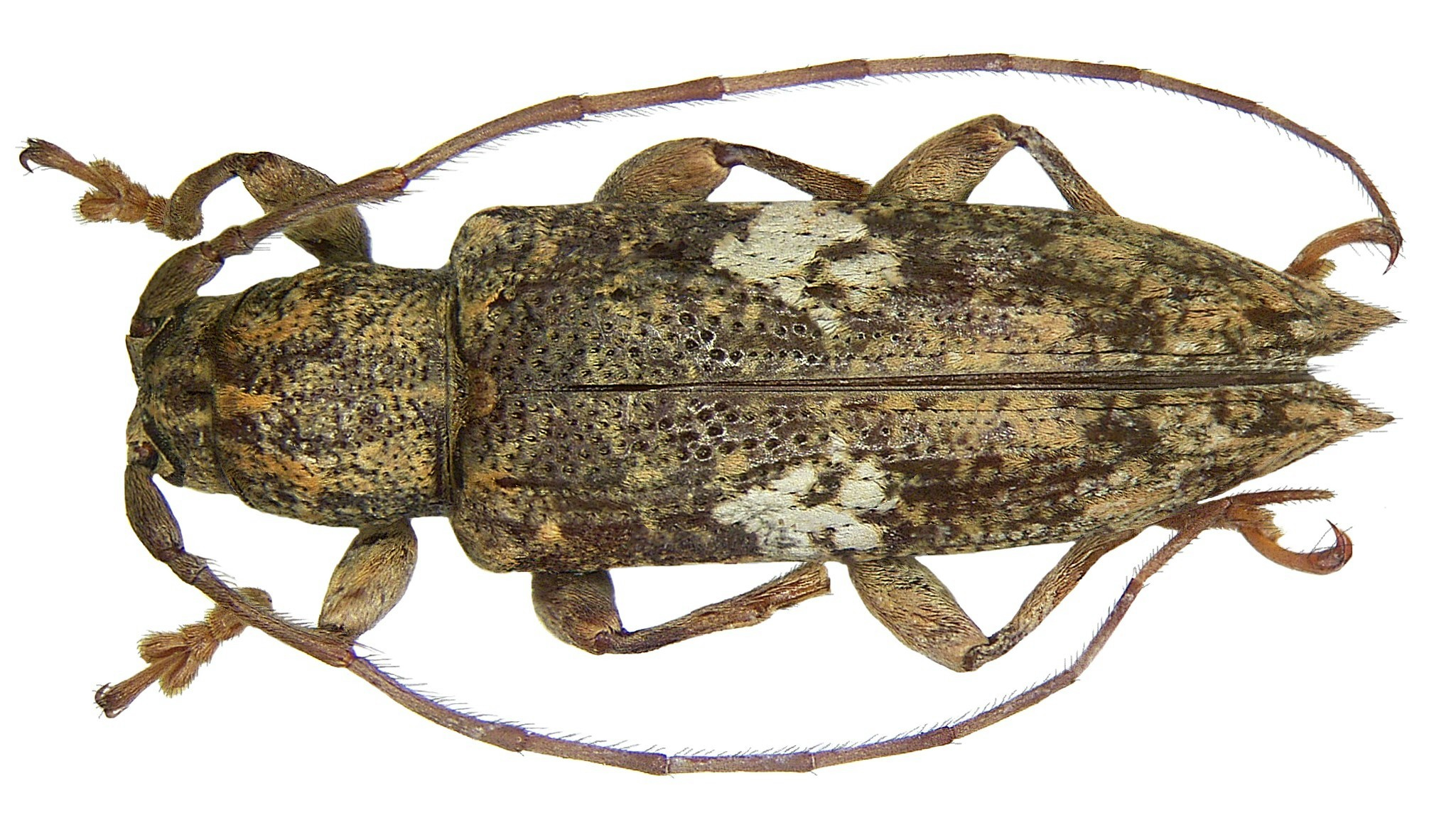

Scientific classification
- Domain: Eukaryota
- Kingdom: Animalia
- Phylum: Arthropoda
- Class: Insecta
- Order: Coleoptera
- Suborder: Polyphaga
- Infraorder: Cucujiformia
- Family: Cerambycidae
- Genus: Sybra
- Species: S. mediomaculata

Binomial name
- Sybra mediomaculata (Heller, 1924)

Synonyms
- Atelais mediomaculata Heller, 1924; Parepilysta medioalbosignata Breuning, 1960

= Sybra mediomaculata =

Species of beetle

Sybra mediomaculata is a species of beetle in the family Cerambycidae. It was described by Heller in 1924.
