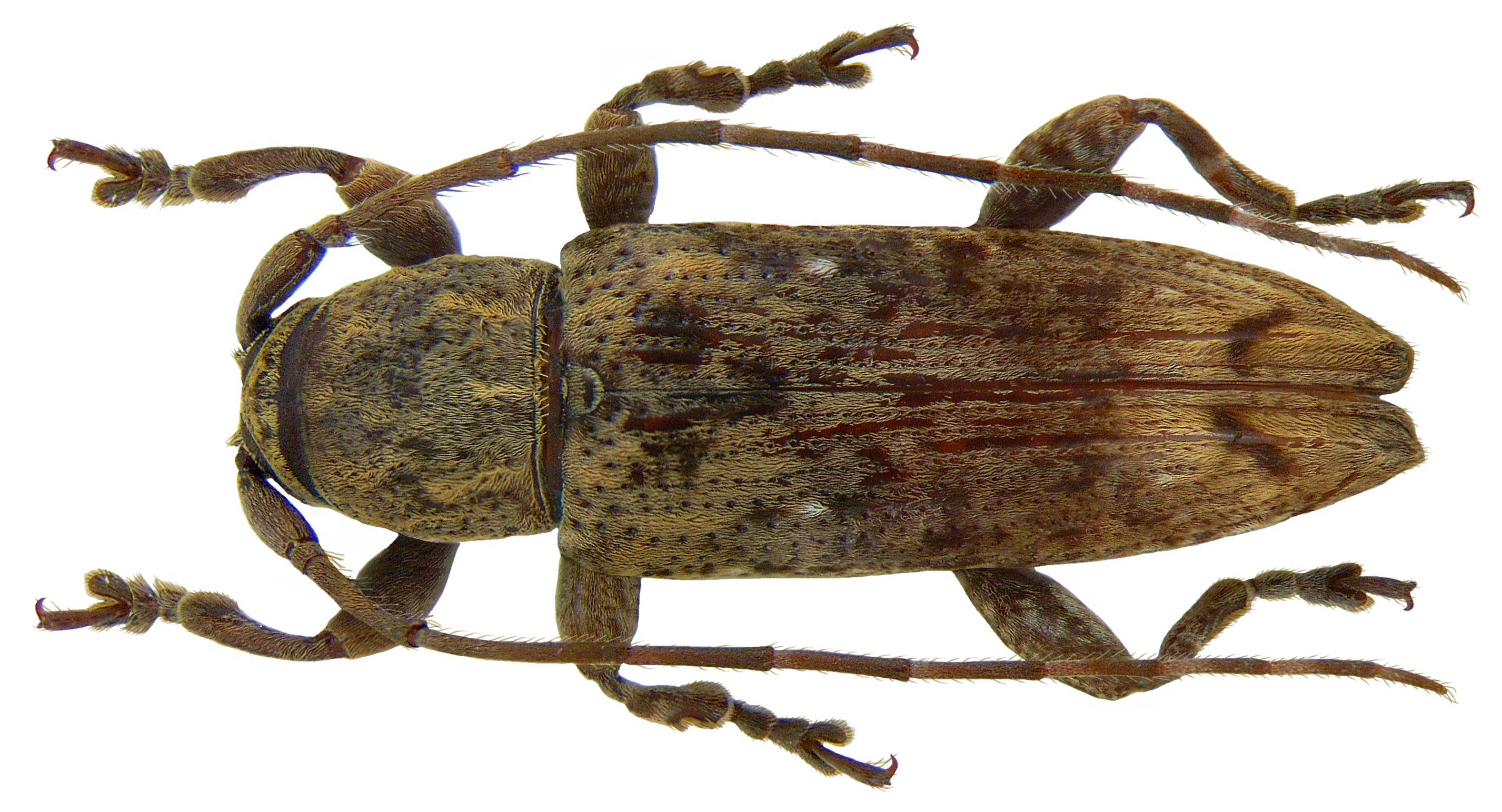

Scientific classification
- Domain: Eukaryota
- Kingdom: Animalia
- Phylum: Arthropoda
- Class: Insecta
- Order: Coleoptera
- Suborder: Polyphaga
- Infraorder: Cucujiformia
- Family: Cerambycidae
- Genus: Sybra
- Species: S. arator

Binomial name
- Sybra arator Pascoe, 1865

Synonyms
- Sybra incanoides Breuning, 1942

= Sybra arator =

Species of beetle

Sybra arator is a species of beetle in the family Cerambycidae. It was described by Pascoe in 1865. It is known from Malaysia, Singapore, and Sumatra.
