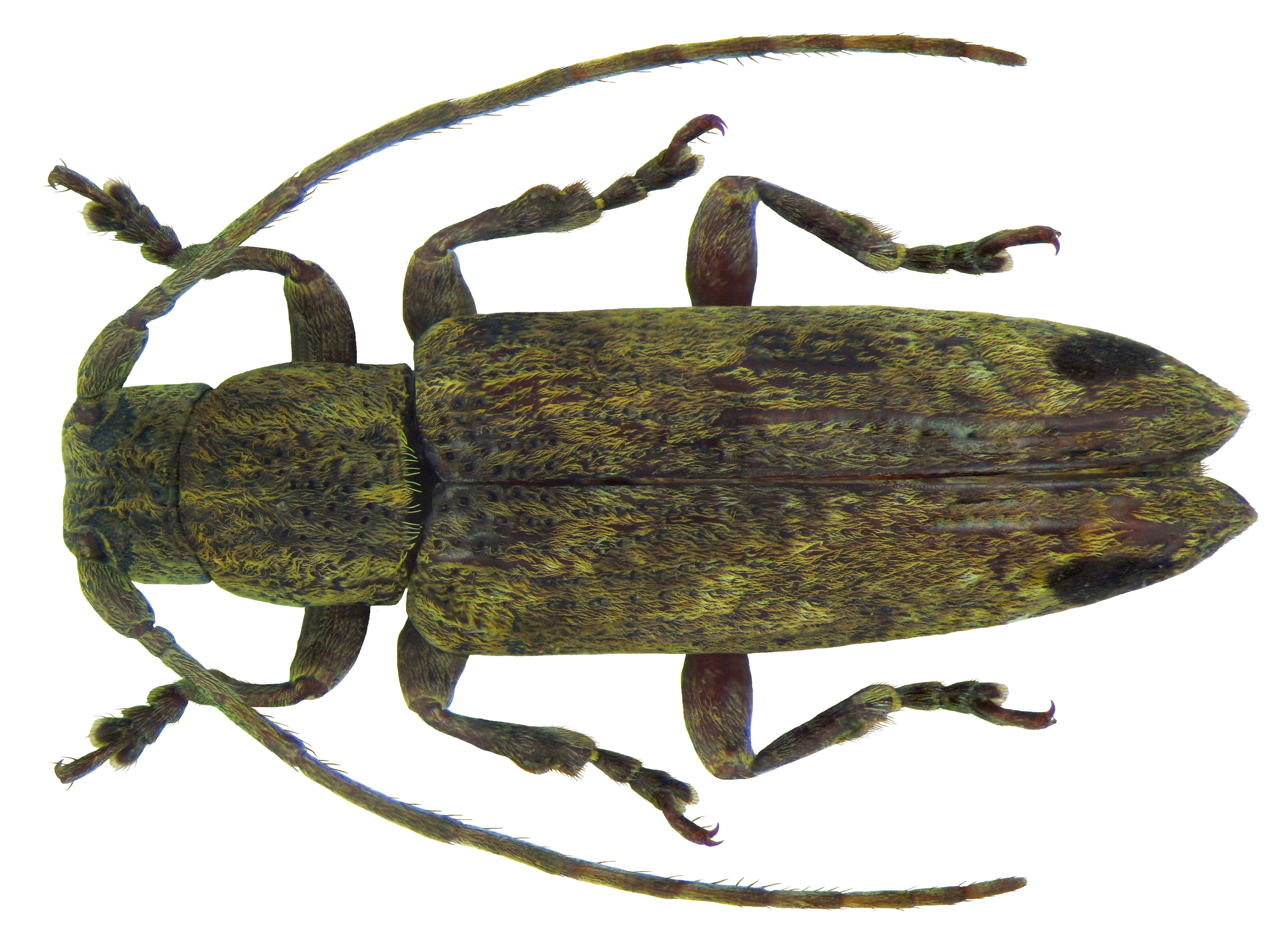

Scientific classification
- Domain: Eukaryota
- Kingdom: Animalia
- Phylum: Arthropoda
- Class: Insecta
- Order: Coleoptera
- Suborder: Polyphaga
- Infraorder: Cucujiformia
- Family: Cerambycidae
- Genus: Sybra
- Species: S. praeusta

Binomial name
- Sybra praeusta (Pascoe, 1859)

Synonyms
- Sybra ceylonensis Breuning, 1939

= Sybra praeusta =

Species of beetle

Sybra praeusta is a species of beetle in the family Cerambycidae. It was described by Francis Polkinghorne Pascoe in 1859.
