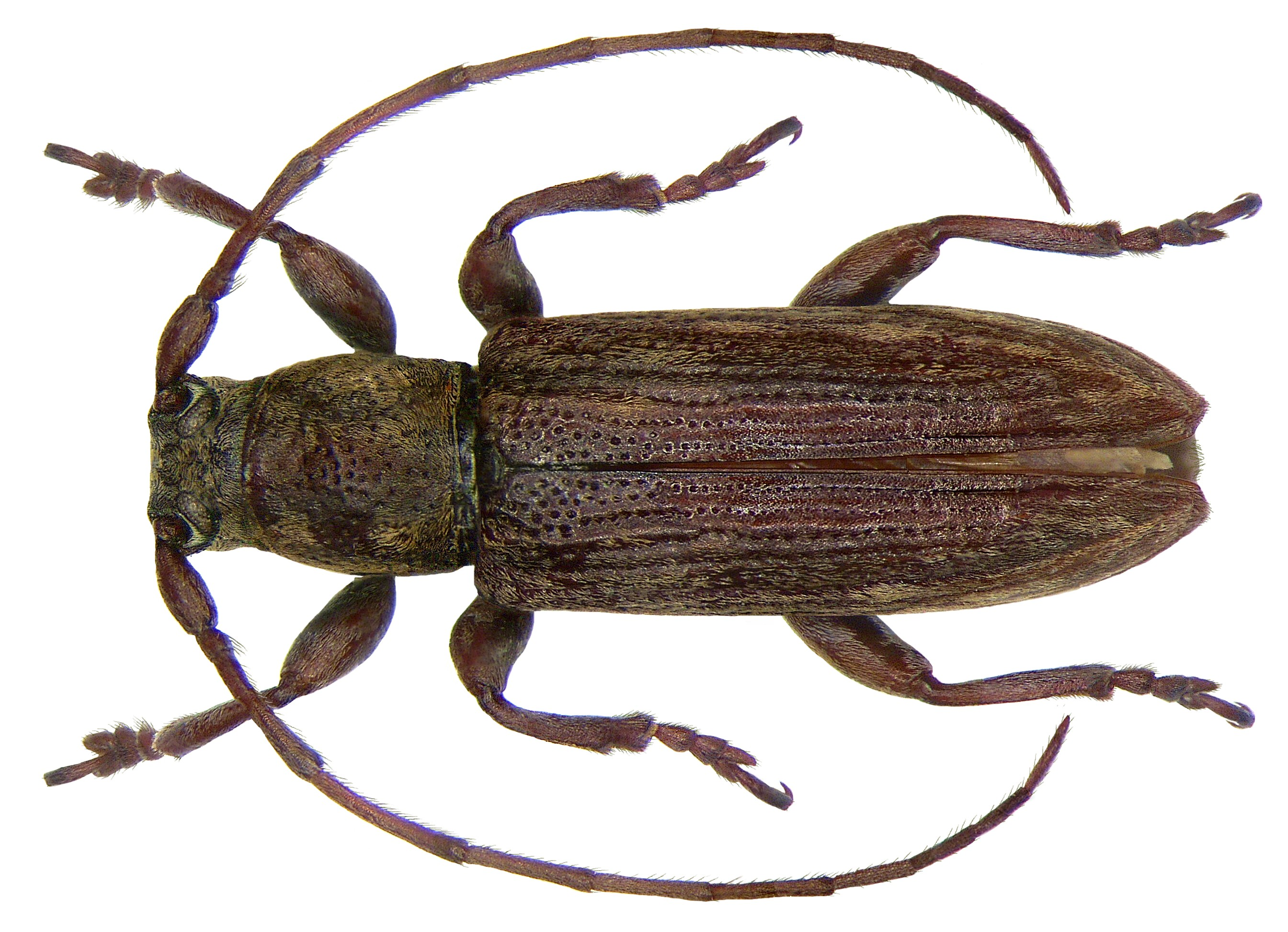

Scientific classification
- Kingdom: Animalia
- Phylum: Arthropoda
- Class: Insecta
- Order: Coleoptera
- Suborder: Polyphaga
- Infraorder: Cucujiformia
- Family: Cerambycidae
- Genus: Sybra
- Species: S. aequabilis

Binomial name
- Sybra aequabilis Breuning, 1938

Synonyms
- Sybra beccarii Breuning, 1939; Sybra szekessyi Breuning, 1954

= Sybra aequabilis =

Species of beetle

Sybra aequabilis is a species of beetle in the family Cerambycidae. It was described by Breuning in 1938.
