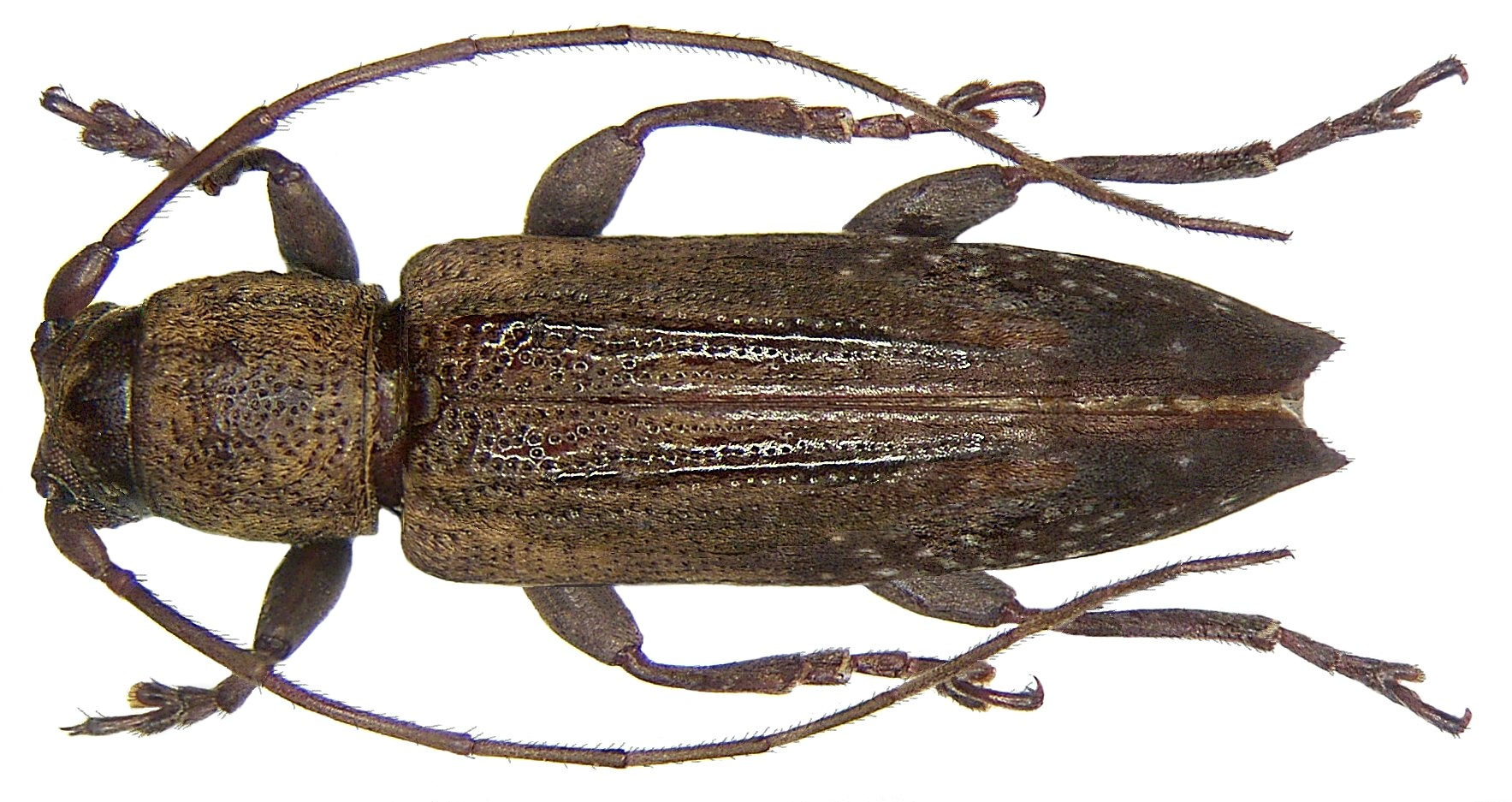

Scientific classification
- Domain: Eukaryota
- Kingdom: Animalia
- Phylum: Arthropoda
- Class: Insecta
- Order: Coleoptera
- Suborder: Polyphaga
- Infraorder: Cucujiformia
- Family: Cerambycidae
- Genus: Sybra
- Species: S. pulverea

Binomial name
- Sybra pulverea Pascoe, 1865

Synonyms
- Sybra densestictipennis Breuning, 1975

= Sybra pulverea =

Species of beetle

Sybra pulverea is a species of beetle in the family Cerambycidae. It was described by Pascoe in 1865.
