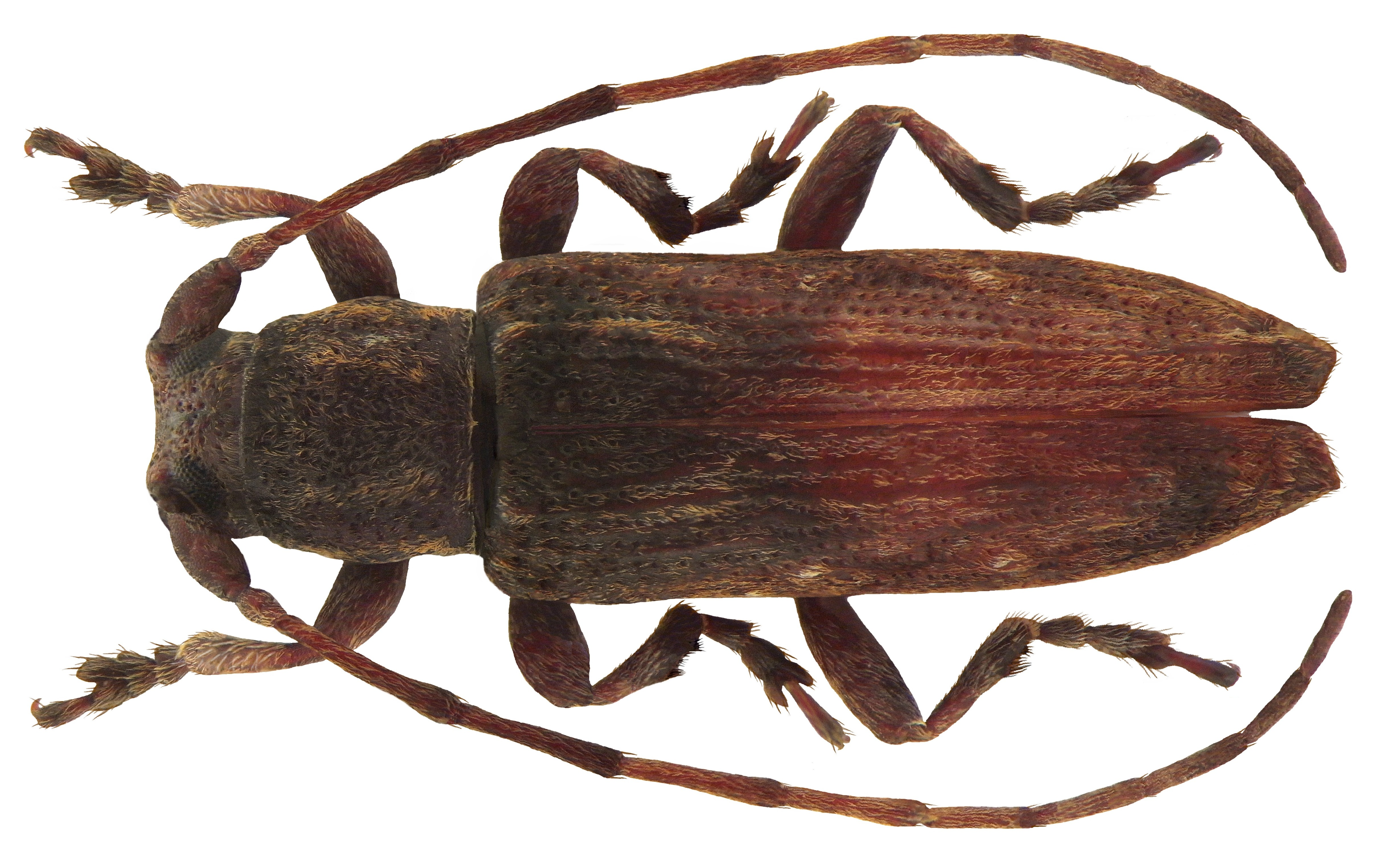

Scientific classification
- Kingdom: Animalia
- Phylum: Arthropoda
- Class: Insecta
- Order: Coleoptera
- Suborder: Polyphaga
- Infraorder: Cucujiformia
- Family: Cerambycidae
- Genus: Sybra
- Species: S. albomaculata

Binomial name
- Sybra albomaculata Breuning, 1939

= Sybra albomaculata =

Species of beetle

Sybra albomaculata is a species of beetle in the family Cerambycidae. It was described by Stephan von Breuning in 1939. It contains two subspecies, Sybra albomaculata albomaculata and Sybra albomaculata formosana.
