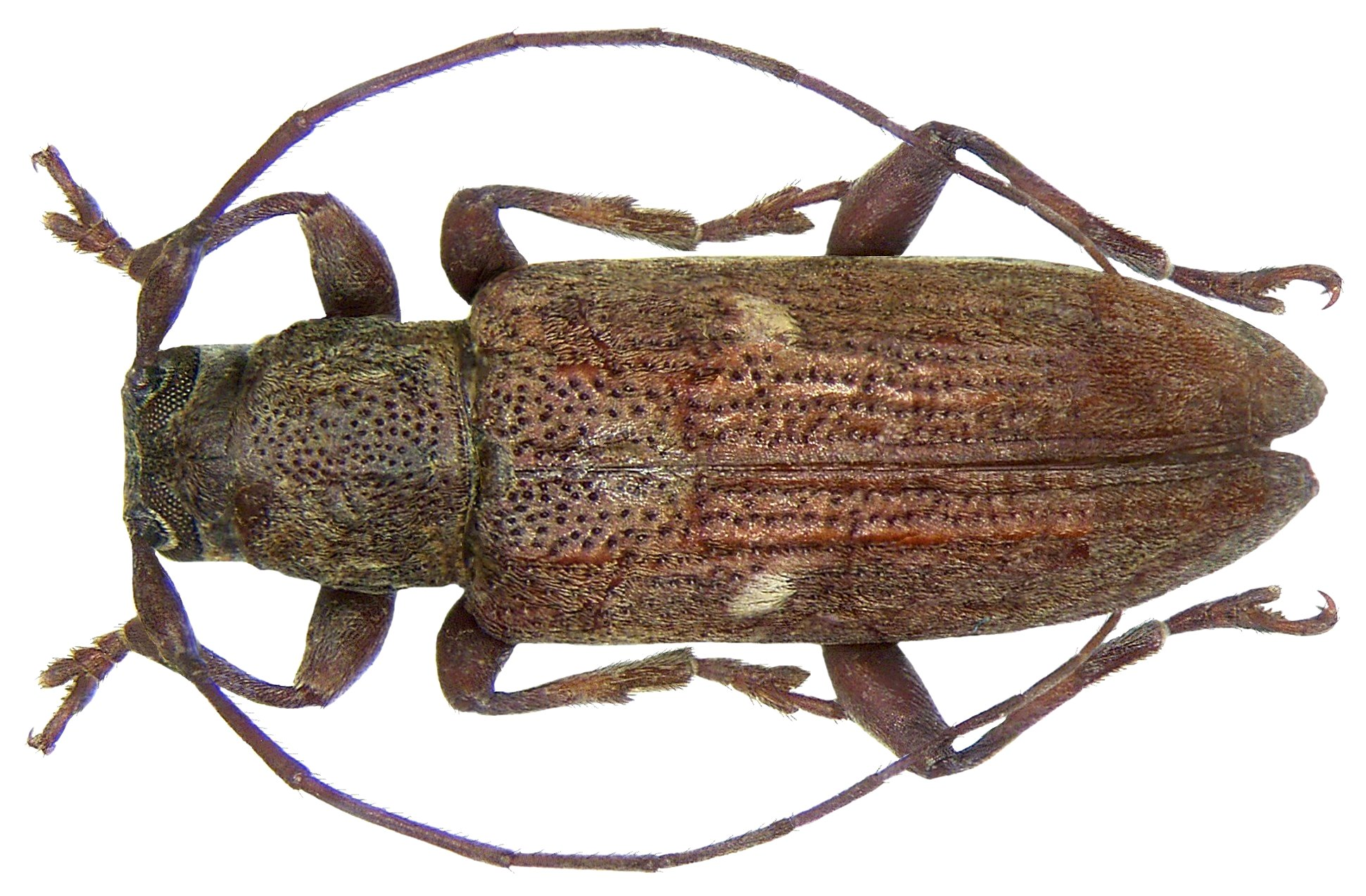

Scientific classification
- Domain: Eukaryota
- Kingdom: Animalia
- Phylum: Arthropoda
- Class: Insecta
- Order: Coleoptera
- Suborder: Polyphaga
- Infraorder: Cucujiformia
- Family: Cerambycidae
- Genus: Sybra
- Species: S. seriata

Binomial name
- Sybra seriata (Pascoe, 1867)

= Sybra seriata =

Species of beetle

Sybra seriata is a species of beetle in the family Cerambycidae. It was described by Pascoe in 1867.
