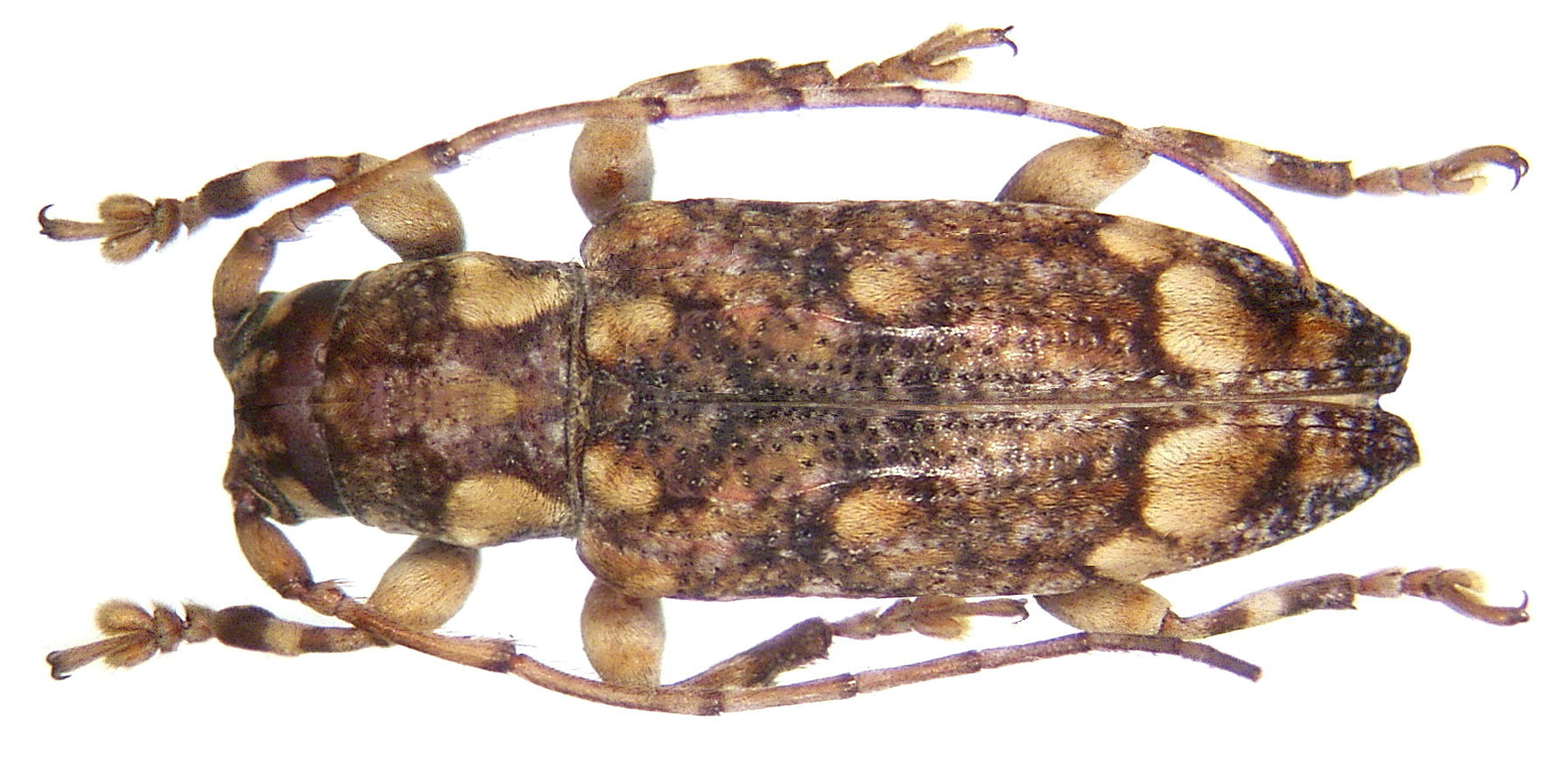

Scientific classification
- Domain: Eukaryota
- Kingdom: Animalia
- Phylum: Arthropoda
- Class: Insecta
- Order: Coleoptera
- Suborder: Polyphaga
- Infraorder: Cucujiformia
- Family: Cerambycidae
- Genus: Sybra
- Species: S. pantherina

Binomial name
- Sybra pantherina Heller, 1916

= Sybra pantherina =

Species of beetle

Sybra pantherina is a species of beetle in the family Cerambycidae. It was described by Heller in 1915.
