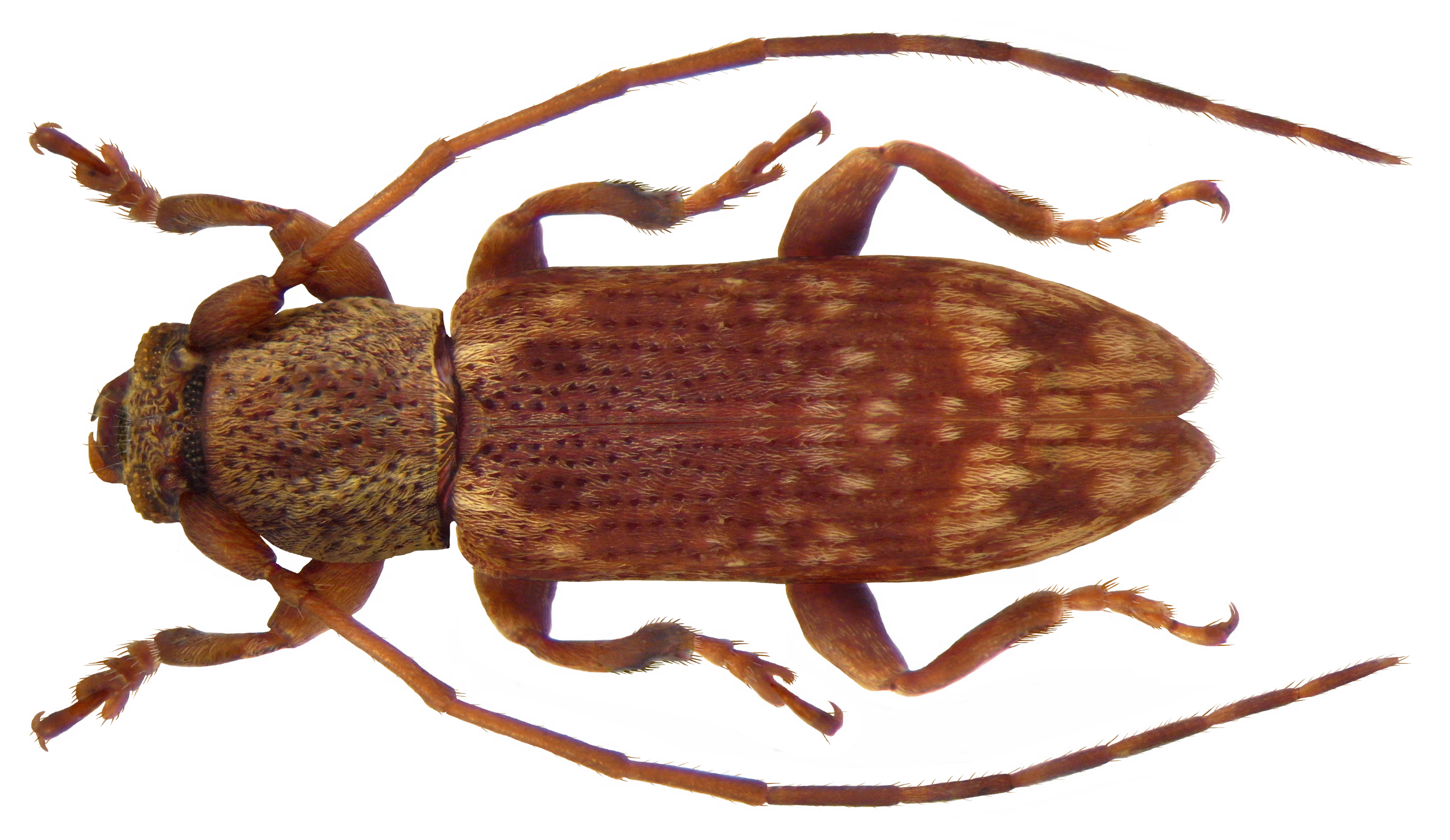

Scientific classification
- Kingdom: Animalia
- Phylum: Arthropoda
- Class: Insecta
- Order: Coleoptera
- Suborder: Polyphaga
- Infraorder: Cucujiformia
- Family: Cerambycidae
- Genus: Sybra
- Species: S. palliata

Binomial name
- Sybra palliata Pascoe, 1865

= Sybra palliata =

Species of beetle

Sybra palliata is a species of beetle in the family Cerambycidae. It was described by Pascoe in 1865. It is known from Borneo.
