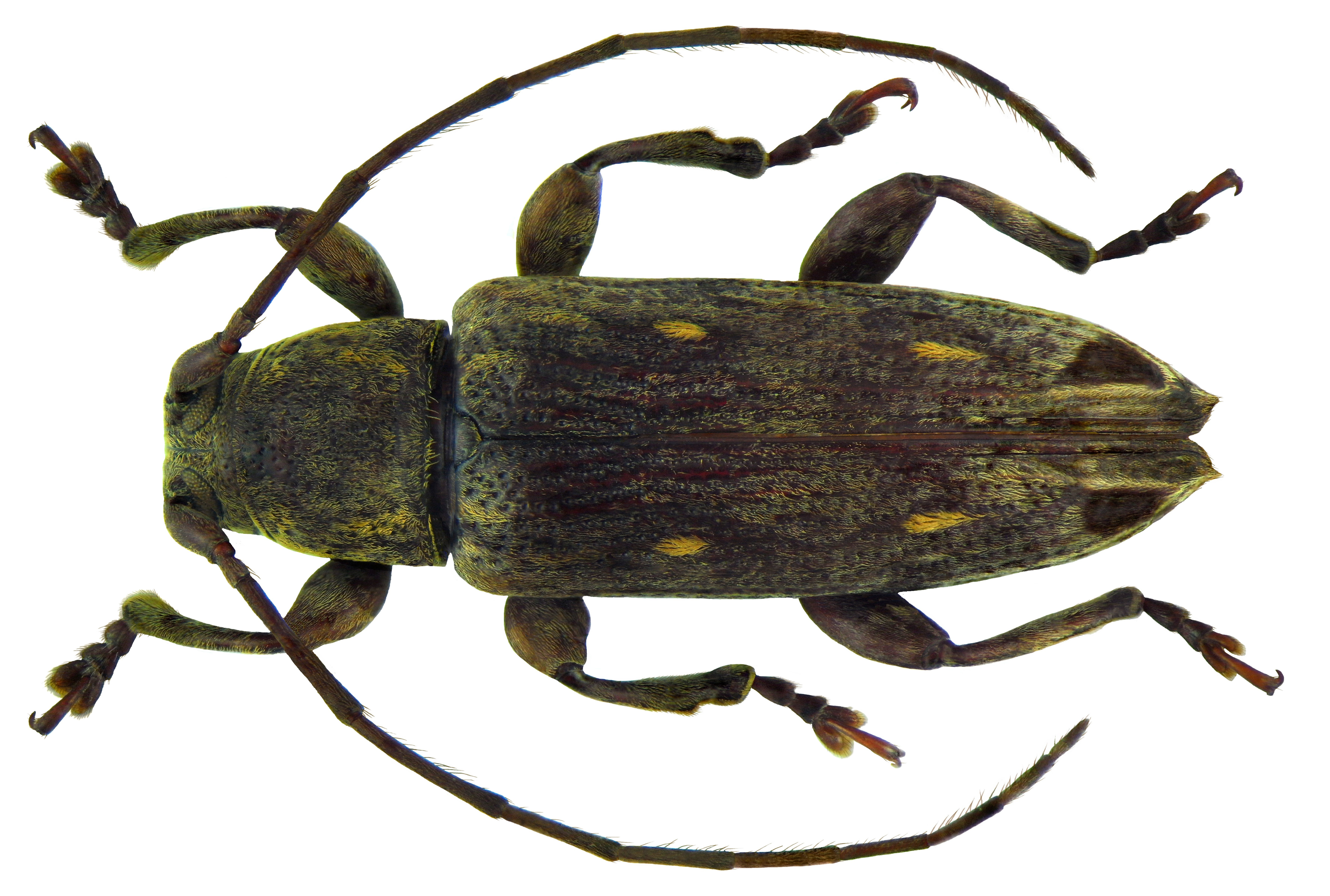

Scientific classification
- Kingdom: Animalia
- Phylum: Arthropoda
- Class: Insecta
- Order: Coleoptera
- Suborder: Polyphaga
- Infraorder: Cucujiformia
- Family: Cerambycidae
- Genus: Sybra
- Species: S. preapicetriangularis

Binomial name
- Sybra preapicetriangularis Breuning, 1973

= Sybra preapicetriangularis =

Species of beetle

Sybra preapicetriangularis is a species of beetle in the family Cerambycidae. It was described by Breuning in 1973.
