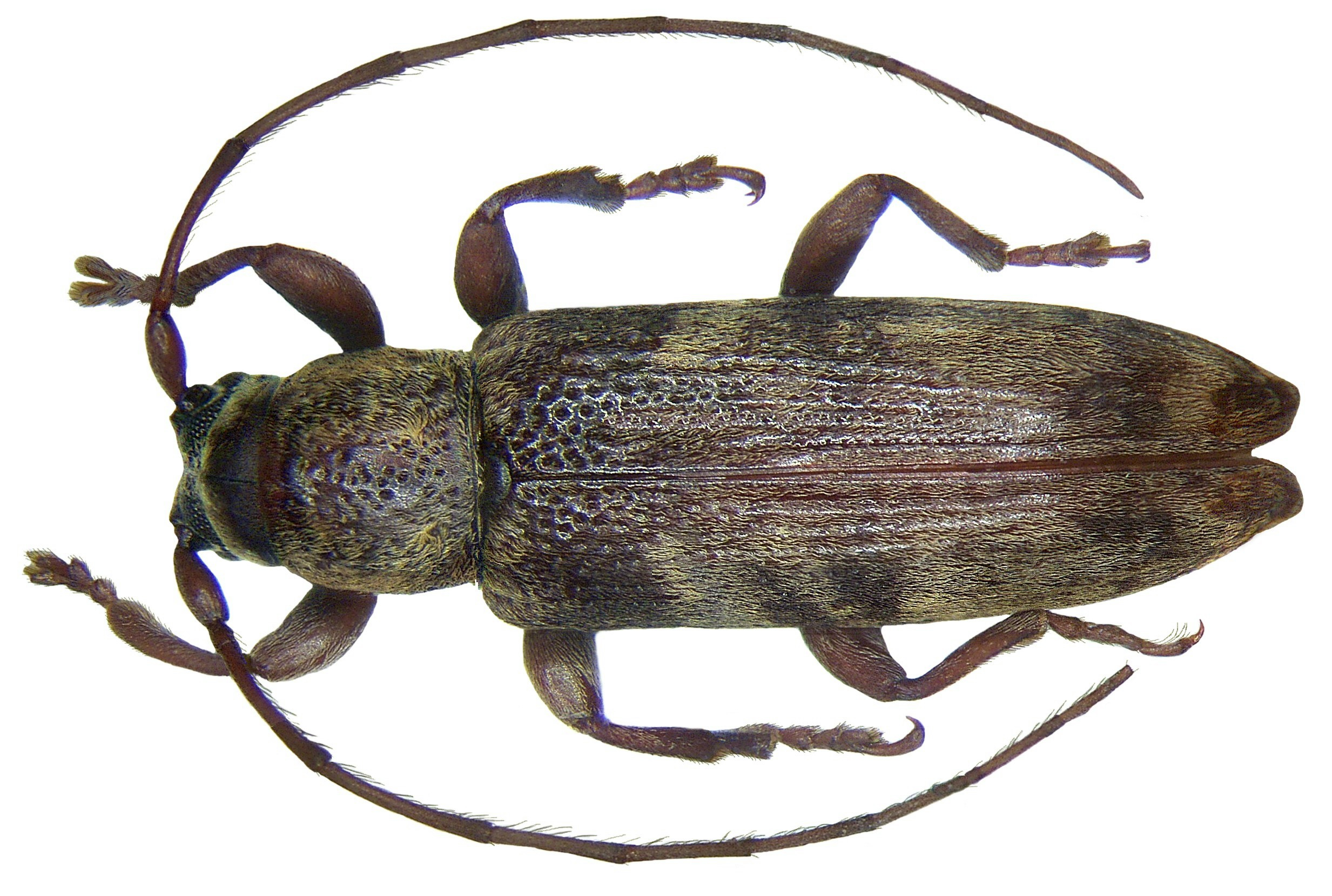

Scientific classification
- Kingdom: Animalia
- Phylum: Arthropoda
- Class: Insecta
- Order: Coleoptera
- Suborder: Polyphaga
- Infraorder: Cucujiformia
- Family: Cerambycidae
- Genus: Sybra
- Species: S. nubila

Binomial name
- Sybra nubila Pascoe, 1863

= Sybra nubila =

Species of beetle

Sybra nubila is a species of beetle in the family Cerambycidae. It was described by Francis Polkinghorne Pascoe in 1863.
