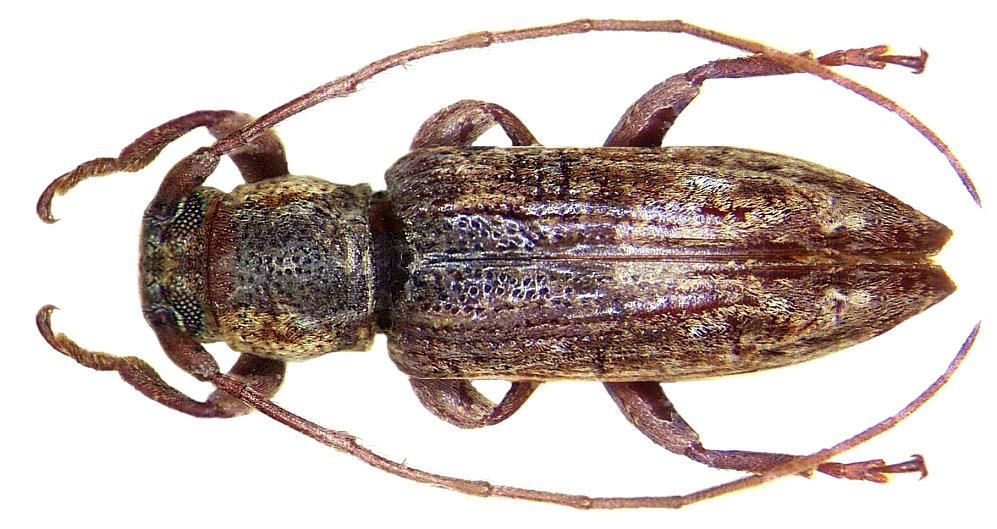

Scientific classification
- Domain: Eukaryota
- Kingdom: Animalia
- Phylum: Arthropoda
- Class: Insecta
- Order: Coleoptera
- Suborder: Polyphaga
- Infraorder: Cucujiformia
- Family: Cerambycidae
- Genus: Sybra
- Species: S. stigmatica

Binomial name
- Sybra stigmatica (Pascoe, 1859)

Synonyms
- Ropica stigmatica Pascoe, 1859; Sybra luteicornis Pascoe, 1865

= Sybra stigmatica =

Species of beetle

Sybra stigmatica is a species of beetle in the family Cerambycidae. It was described by Francis Polkinghorne Pascoe in 1859. It is known from Indonesia.
