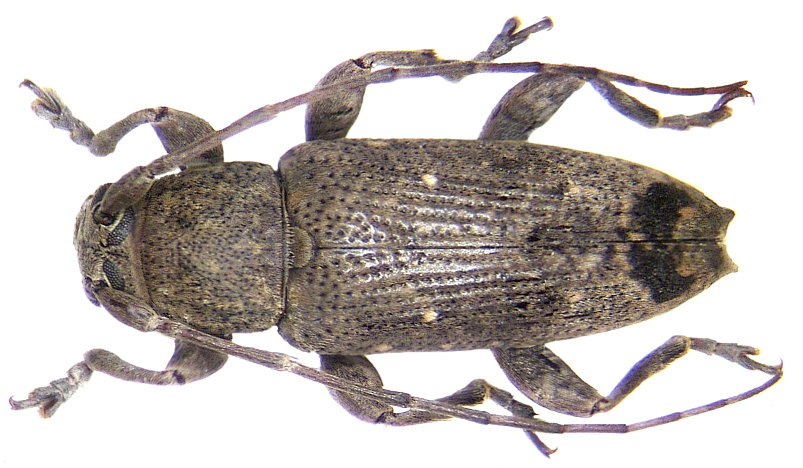

Scientific classification
- Kingdom: Animalia
- Phylum: Arthropoda
- Class: Insecta
- Order: Coleoptera
- Suborder: Polyphaga
- Infraorder: Cucujiformia
- Family: Cerambycidae
- Genus: Sybra
- Species: S. incana

Binomial name
- Sybra incana (Pascoe, 1859)

Synonyms
- Sybra mucronata Pascoe, 1865; Sybra pseudincana Breuning, 1939

= Sybra incana =

Species of beetle

Sybra incana is a species of beetle in the family Cerambycidae. It was described by Francis Polkinghorne Pascoe in 1859. It is known from Moluccas and Papua New Guinea.
