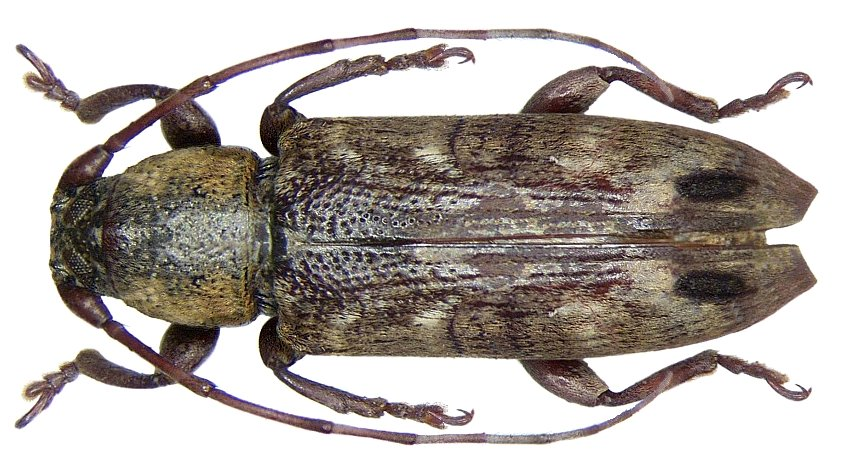

Scientific classification
- Domain: Eukaryota
- Kingdom: Animalia
- Phylum: Arthropoda
- Class: Insecta
- Order: Coleoptera
- Suborder: Polyphaga
- Infraorder: Cucujiformia
- Family: Cerambycidae
- Genus: Sybra
- Species: S. signata

Binomial name
- Sybra signata (Perroud, 1855)

= Sybra signata =

Species of beetle

Sybra signata is a species of beetle in the family Cerambycidae. It was described by Perroud in 1855.
