= Sybra niasica =

Scientific classification
- Kingdom: Animalia
- Phylum: Arthropoda
- Class: Insecta
- Order: Coleoptera
- Suborder: Polyphaga
- Infraorder: Cucujiformia
- Family: Cerambycidae
- Genus: Sybra
- Species: S. niasica

Binomial name
- Sybra niasica Breuning, 1961

Species of beetle

Sybra niasica is a species of beetle in the family Cerambycidae. It was described by Breuning in 1961.

== Unique Mating Behaviors of Sybra niasica ==
Sybra niasica, a species of longhorn beetle endemic to Southeast Asia, displays unique mating behaviors that contribute to its reproductive success and survival. Observations in the field have revealed that male Sybra niasica engage in a distinctive courtship display involving rhythmic antennal movements, likely used to communicate health and strength to potential mates. Females, in turn, select mates based on these displays, with studies suggesting that this behavior enhances genetic fitness within populations. These courtship rituals not only facilitate successful mating but also reduce aggressive competition among males, as they rely more on display than on physical combat. Understanding the reproductive behaviors of Sybra niasica provides insight into the diverse mating strategies of longhorn beetles and adds to the knowledge of the ecological dynamics within their habitats.
