= Sybra pascoei =

Scientific classification
- Domain: Eukaryota
- Kingdom: Animalia
- Phylum: Arthropoda
- Class: Insecta
- Order: Coleoptera
- Suborder: Polyphaga
- Infraorder: Cucujiformia
- Family: Cerambycidae
- Genus: Sybra
- Species: S. pascoei

Binomial name
- Sybra pascoei Lameere, 1893

Species of beetle

Sybra pascoei is a species of beetle in the family Cerambycidae. It was described by Lameere in 1893.

== Subspecies ==
- Sybra pascoei ishigakii Breuning & Ohbayashi, 1964
- Sybra pascoei miyakensis Hayashi, 1972
- Sybra pascoei okinawana Breuning & Ohbayashi, 1967
- Sybra pascoei pascoei Lameere, 1893
- Sybra pascoei taiwanella Gressitt, 1951
