= Sybra subfasciata =

Scientific classification
- Domain: Eukaryota
- Kingdom: Animalia
- Phylum: Arthropoda
- Class: Insecta
- Order: Coleoptera
- Suborder: Polyphaga
- Infraorder: Cucujiformia
- Family: Cerambycidae
- Genus: Sybra
- Species: S. subfasciata

Binomial name
- Sybra subfasciata (Bates, 1884)

Synonyms
- Sybrodiboma subfasciata Bates, 1884

Species of beetle

Sybra subfasciata is a species of beetle in the family Cerambycidae. It was described by Henry Walter Bates in 1884.

== Subspecies ==
- Sybra subfasciata mikuraensis (Hayashi, 1969)
- Sybra subfasciata subfasciata (Bates, 1884)
- Sybra subfasciata trimeresura Takakuwa, 1984
