= Sybra baculina =

Scientific classification
- Domain: Eukaryota
- Kingdom: Animalia
- Phylum: Arthropoda
- Class: Insecta
- Order: Coleoptera
- Suborder: Polyphaga
- Infraorder: Cucujiformia
- Family: Cerambycidae
- Genus: Sybra
- Species: S. baculina

Binomial name
- Sybra baculina Bates, 1866

Synonyms
- Sybra posticalis baculina (Bates) Hayashi, 1956

Species of beetle

Sybra baculina is a species of beetle in the family Cerambycidae. It was described by Henry Walter Bates in 1866. It contains seven subspecies:

- S. baculina baculina
- S. baculina mimogeminata
- S. baculina miyakoana
- S. baculina musashinoi
- S. baculina nipponensis
- S. baculina omoro
- S. baculina oshimana
