= Sybra uenoi =

Scientific classification
- Kingdom: Animalia
- Phylum: Arthropoda
- Class: Insecta
- Order: Coleoptera
- Suborder: Polyphaga
- Infraorder: Cucujiformia
- Family: Cerambycidae
- Genus: Sybra
- Species: S. uenoi

Binomial name
- Sybra uenoi (Hayashi, 1956)

Synonyms
- Microzotale uenoi Hayashi, 1956

Species of beetle

Sybra uenoi is a species of beetle in the family Cerambycidae. It was described by Hayashi in 1956. It is known from Japan.

== Subspecies ==
- Sybra uenoi albodistincta Takakuwa, 1984
- Sybra uenoi sakamotoi (Hayashi, 1958)
- Sybra uenoi uenoi (Hayashi, 1956)
