= Sybra binotata =

Scientific classification
- Kingdom: Animalia
- Phylum: Arthropoda
- Clade: Pancrustacea
- Class: Insecta
- Order: Coleoptera
- Suborder: Polyphaga
- Infraorder: Cucujiformia
- Family: Cerambycidae
- Genus: Sybra
- Species: S. binotata

Binomial name
- Sybra binotata Gahan, 1907

Synonyms
- Oopsis palawanica Aurivillius, 1927; Oopsis philippinarum Aurivillius, 1927; Sybra nigrofasciata Aurivillius, 1927; Sybra truncatipennis Breuning, 1950

Species of beetle

Sybra binotata is a species of beetle in the family Cerambycidae. It was described by Gahan in 1907. It is known from Borneo, Sumatra, and the Philippines.
