= Sybra strandi =

Scientific classification
- Kingdom: Animalia
- Phylum: Arthropoda
- Class: Insecta
- Order: Coleoptera
- Suborder: Polyphaga
- Infraorder: Cucujiformia
- Family: Cerambycidae
- Genus: Sybra
- Species: S. strandi

Binomial name
- Sybra strandi Breuning, 1939

Species of beetle

Sybra strandi is a species of beetle in the family Cerambycidae. It was described by Stephan von Breuning in 1939.

It is 6.5–8 mm long and 2–2.25 mm wide, and its type locality is Madurai, India. It was named in honor of Embrik Strand, in whose Festschrift the species description was written.
