= Sybra multicoloripennis =

Scientific classification
- Kingdom: Animalia
- Phylum: Arthropoda
- Class: Insecta
- Order: Coleoptera
- Suborder: Polyphaga
- Infraorder: Cucujiformia
- Family: Cerambycidae
- Genus: Sybra
- Species: S. multicoloripennis

Binomial name
- Sybra multicoloripennis Breuning, 1971

Synonyms
- Sybra tricoloripennis Breuning, 1969 nec Breuning, 1961

Species of beetle

Sybra multicoloripennis is a species of beetle in the family Cerambycidae. It was described by Breuning in 1971. It is known from Borneo.
