= Sybra freyi =

Scientific classification
- Kingdom: Animalia
- Phylum: Arthropoda
- Class: Insecta
- Order: Coleoptera
- Suborder: Polyphaga
- Infraorder: Cucujiformia
- Family: Cerambycidae
- Genus: Sybra
- Species: S. freyi

Binomial name
- Sybra freyi Breuning, 1957

Species of beetle

Sybra freyi is a species of beetle in the family Cerambycidae. It was described by Breuning in 1957. The species is 7–9 millimetres (0.28–0.35 in) long and 2–3 millimetres (0.079–0.118 in) wide. It is endemic to New Guinea.
