= Sybra donckieri =

Scientific classification
- Kingdom: Animalia
- Phylum: Arthropoda
- Class: Insecta
- Order: Coleoptera
- Suborder: Polyphaga
- Infraorder: Cucujiformia
- Family: Cerambycidae
- Genus: Sybra
- Species: S. donckieri

Binomial name
- Sybra donckieri Pic in Breuning, 1939

Species of beetle

Sybra donckieri is a species of beetle in the family Cerambycidae. It was described by Maurice Pic in 1939 on the basis of a specimen collected in Palembang, Sumatra. The adult body measures 6 mm long and 2 mm wide.
