= Sybra puella =

Scientific classification
- Domain: Eukaryota
- Kingdom: Animalia
- Phylum: Arthropoda
- Class: Insecta
- Order: Coleoptera
- Suborder: Polyphaga
- Infraorder: Cucujiformia
- Family: Cerambycidae
- Genus: Sybra
- Species: S. puella

Binomial name
- Sybra puella (Dillon & Dillon, 1952)

Synonyms
- Microopsis puella Dillon & Dillon, 1952

Species of beetle

Sybra puella is a species of beetle in the family Cerambycidae. It was described by Dillon and Dillon in 1952.
