= Sybra mikurensis =

Scientific classification
- Kingdom: Animalia
- Phylum: Arthropoda
- Class: Insecta
- Order: Coleoptera
- Suborder: Polyphaga
- Infraorder: Cucujiformia
- Family: Cerambycidae
- Genus: Sybra
- Species: S. mikurensis

Binomial name
- Sybra mikurensis Hayashi, 1969

Synonyms
- Sybrodiboma mikurensis Hayashi, 1969

Species of beetle

Sybra mikurensis is a species of beetle in the family Cerambycidae. It was described by Hayashi in 1969.
