= Sybra dorsata =

Scientific classification
- Kingdom: Animalia
- Phylum: Arthropoda
- Class: Insecta
- Order: Coleoptera
- Suborder: Polyphaga
- Infraorder: Cucujiformia
- Family: Cerambycidae
- Genus: Sybra
- Species: S. dorsata

Binomial name
- Sybra dorsata (Fairmaire, 1881)

Synonyms
- Oopsis dorsatus Fairmaire, 1881

Species of beetle

Sybra dorsata is a species of beetle in the family Cerambycidae. It was described by Fairmaire in 1881.
