= Sybra mastersi =

Scientific classification
- Domain: Eukaryota
- Kingdom: Animalia
- Phylum: Arthropoda
- Class: Insecta
- Order: Coleoptera
- Suborder: Polyphaga
- Infraorder: Cucujiformia
- Family: Cerambycidae
- Genus: Sybra
- Species: S. mastersi

Binomial name
- Sybra mastersi Blackburn, 1894

Species of beetle

Sybra mastersi is a species of beetle in the family Cerambycidae. It was described by Blackburn in 1894. It is known from Australia.
