= Sybra botelensis =

Scientific classification
- Kingdom: Animalia
- Phylum: Arthropoda
- Class: Insecta
- Order: Coleoptera
- Suborder: Polyphaga
- Infraorder: Cucujiformia
- Family: Cerambycidae
- Genus: Sybra
- Species: S. botelensis

Binomial name
- Sybra botelensis Breuning & Ohbayashi, 1966

Species of beetle

Sybra botelensis is a species of beetle in the family Cerambycidae. It was described by Stephan von Breuning and Ohbayashi in 1966.
