= Sybra ochreosignatipennis =

Scientific classification
- Kingdom: Animalia
- Phylum: Arthropoda
- Class: Insecta
- Order: Coleoptera
- Suborder: Polyphaga
- Infraorder: Cucujiformia
- Family: Cerambycidae
- Genus: Sybra
- Species: S. ochreosignatipennis

Binomial name
- Sybra ochreosignatipennis Breuning, 1973

Species of beetle

The beetle species Sybra ochreosignatipennis belongs to the Cerambycidae family and was first described by Breuning in 1973.
