= Sybra okinawana =

Scientific classification
- Kingdom: Animalia
- Phylum: Arthropoda
- Class: Insecta
- Order: Coleoptera
- Suborder: Polyphaga
- Infraorder: Cucujiformia
- Family: Cerambycidae
- Genus: Sybra
- Species: S. okinawana

Binomial name
- Sybra okinawana Breuning & Ohbayashi, 1970

Species of beetle

Sybra okinawana is a species of beetle in the family Cerambycidae. It was described by Stephan von Breuning and Ohbayashi in 1970.
