= Sybra yokoi =

Scientific classification
- Domain: Eukaryota
- Kingdom: Animalia
- Phylum: Arthropoda
- Class: Insecta
- Order: Coleoptera
- Suborder: Polyphaga
- Infraorder: Cucujiformia
- Family: Cerambycidae
- Genus: Sybra
- Species: S. yokoi

Binomial name
- Sybra yokoi Skale & Weigel, 2014

Species of beetle

Sybra yokoi is a species of beetle in the family Cerambycidae. It was described by Skale and Weigel in 2014.
