= Sybra signatipennis =

Scientific classification
- Domain: Eukaryota
- Kingdom: Animalia
- Phylum: Arthropoda
- Class: Insecta
- Order: Coleoptera
- Suborder: Polyphaga
- Infraorder: Cucujiformia
- Family: Cerambycidae
- Genus: Sybra
- Species: S. signatipennis

Binomial name
- Sybra signatipennis Fisher, 1927

Species of beetle

Sybra signatipennis is a species of beetle in the family Cerambycidae. It was described by Fisher in 1927.
