= Sybra basialbofasciata =

Scientific classification
- Kingdom: Animalia
- Phylum: Arthropoda
- Class: Insecta
- Order: Coleoptera
- Suborder: Polyphaga
- Infraorder: Cucujiformia
- Family: Cerambycidae
- Genus: Sybra
- Species: S. basialbofasciata

Binomial name
- Sybra basialbofasciata Hayashi, 1972

Species of beetle

Sybra basialbofasciata is a species of beetle in the family Cerambycidae. It was described by Hayashi in 1972.
