= Sybra emarginata =

Scientific classification
- Domain: Eukaryota
- Kingdom: Animalia
- Phylum: Arthropoda
- Class: Insecta
- Order: Coleoptera
- Suborder: Polyphaga
- Infraorder: Cucujiformia
- Family: Cerambycidae
- Genus: Sybra
- Species: S. emarginata

Binomial name
- Sybra emarginata Gressitt, 1956

Species of beetle

Sybra emarginata is a species of beetle in the family Cerambycidae. It was described by Gressitt in 1956.
