= Sybra distincta =

Scientific classification
- Domain: Eukaryota
- Kingdom: Animalia
- Phylum: Arthropoda
- Class: Insecta
- Order: Coleoptera
- Suborder: Polyphaga
- Infraorder: Cucujiformia
- Family: Cerambycidae
- Genus: Sybra
- Species: S. distincta

Binomial name
- Sybra distincta Takakuwa, 1984

Species of beetle

Sybra distincta is a species of beetle in the family Cerambycidae. It was described by Takakuwa in 1984.
