= Sybra fauveli =

Scientific classification
- Domain: Eukaryota
- Kingdom: Animalia
- Phylum: Arthropoda
- Class: Insecta
- Order: Coleoptera
- Suborder: Polyphaga
- Infraorder: Cucujiformia
- Family: Cerambycidae
- Genus: Sybra
- Species: S. fauveli

Binomial name
- Sybra fauveli (Théry, 1897)

Species of beetle

Sybra fauveli is a species of beetle in the family Cerambycidae. It was described by Théry in 1897.
