= Sybra ochraceovittata =

Scientific classification
- Kingdom: Animalia
- Phylum: Arthropoda
- Class: Insecta
- Order: Coleoptera
- Suborder: Polyphaga
- Infraorder: Cucujiformia
- Family: Cerambycidae
- Genus: Sybra
- Species: S. ochraceovittata

Binomial name
- Sybra ochraceovittata Breuning, 1950

Species of beetle

Sybra ochraceovittata is a species of beetle in the family Cerambycidae. It was described by Breuning in 1950.
