= Sybra erratica =

Scientific classification
- Domain: Eukaryota
- Kingdom: Animalia
- Phylum: Arthropoda
- Class: Insecta
- Order: Coleoptera
- Suborder: Polyphaga
- Infraorder: Cucujiformia
- Family: Cerambycidae
- Genus: Sybra
- Species: S. erratica

Binomial name
- Sybra erratica Pascoe, 1865

Species of beetle

Sybra erratica is a species of beetle in the family Cerambycidae. It was described by Pascoe in 1865.
