= Sybra maculiclunis =

Scientific classification
- Domain: Eukaryota
- Kingdom: Animalia
- Phylum: Arthropoda
- Class: Insecta
- Order: Coleoptera
- Suborder: Polyphaga
- Infraorder: Cucujiformia
- Family: Cerambycidae
- Genus: Sybra
- Species: S. maculiclunis

Binomial name
- Sybra maculiclunis Matsushita, 1931

Species of beetle

Sybra maculiclunis is a species of beetle in the family Cerambycidae.
