= Sybra biangulata =

Scientific classification
- Kingdom: Animalia
- Phylum: Arthropoda
- Class: Insecta
- Order: Coleoptera
- Suborder: Polyphaga
- Infraorder: Cucujiformia
- Family: Cerambycidae
- Genus: Sybra
- Species: S. biangulata

Binomial name
- Sybra biangulata (Fairmaire, 1893)

Species of beetle

Sybra biangulata is a species of beetle in the family Cerambycidae. It was described by Fairmaire in 1893.
