= Sybra guamensis =

Scientific classification
- Kingdom: Animalia
- Phylum: Arthropoda
- Class: Insecta
- Order: Coleoptera
- Suborder: Polyphaga
- Infraorder: Cucujiformia
- Family: Cerambycidae
- Genus: Sybra
- Species: S. guamensis

Binomial name
- Sybra guamensis Breuning, 1976

Species of beetle

Sybra guamensis is a species of beetle in the family Cerambycidae. It was described by Stephan von Breuning in 1976.
