= Sybra spinosa =

Scientific classification
- Kingdom: Animalia
- Phylum: Arthropoda
- Class: Insecta
- Order: Coleoptera
- Suborder: Polyphaga
- Infraorder: Cucujiformia
- Family: Cerambycidae
- Genus: Sybra
- Species: S. spinosa

Binomial name
- Sybra spinosa Breuning, 1939

Species of beetle

Sybra spinosa is a species of beetle in the family Cerambycidae. It was described by Stephan von Breuning in 1939.
