= Sybra jaguarita =

Scientific classification
- Kingdom: Animalia
- Phylum: Arthropoda
- Class: Insecta
- Order: Coleoptera
- Suborder: Polyphaga
- Infraorder: Cucujiformia
- Family: Cerambycidae
- Genus: Sybra
- Species: S. jaguarita

Binomial name
- Sybra jaguarita Breuning, 1942

Species of beetle

Sybra jaguarita is a species of beetle in the family Cerambycidae. It was described by Breuning in 1942.
