= Sybra minuta =

Scientific classification
- Kingdom: Animalia
- Phylum: Arthropoda
- Class: Insecta
- Order: Coleoptera
- Suborder: Polyphaga
- Infraorder: Cucujiformia
- Family: Cerambycidae
- Genus: Sybra
- Species: S. minuta

Binomial name
- Sybra minuta (Pic, 1927)

Species of beetle

Sybra minuta is a species of beetle in the family Cerambycidae. It was described by Maurice Pic in 1927.
