= Sybra narai =

Scientific classification
- Kingdom: Animalia
- Phylum: Arthropoda
- Class: Insecta
- Order: Coleoptera
- Suborder: Polyphaga
- Infraorder: Cucujiformia
- Family: Cerambycidae
- Genus: Sybra
- Species: S. narai

Binomial name
- Sybra narai Hayashi, 1976

Species of beetle

Sybra narai is a species of beetle in the family Cerambycidae. It was described by Hayashi in 1976.
