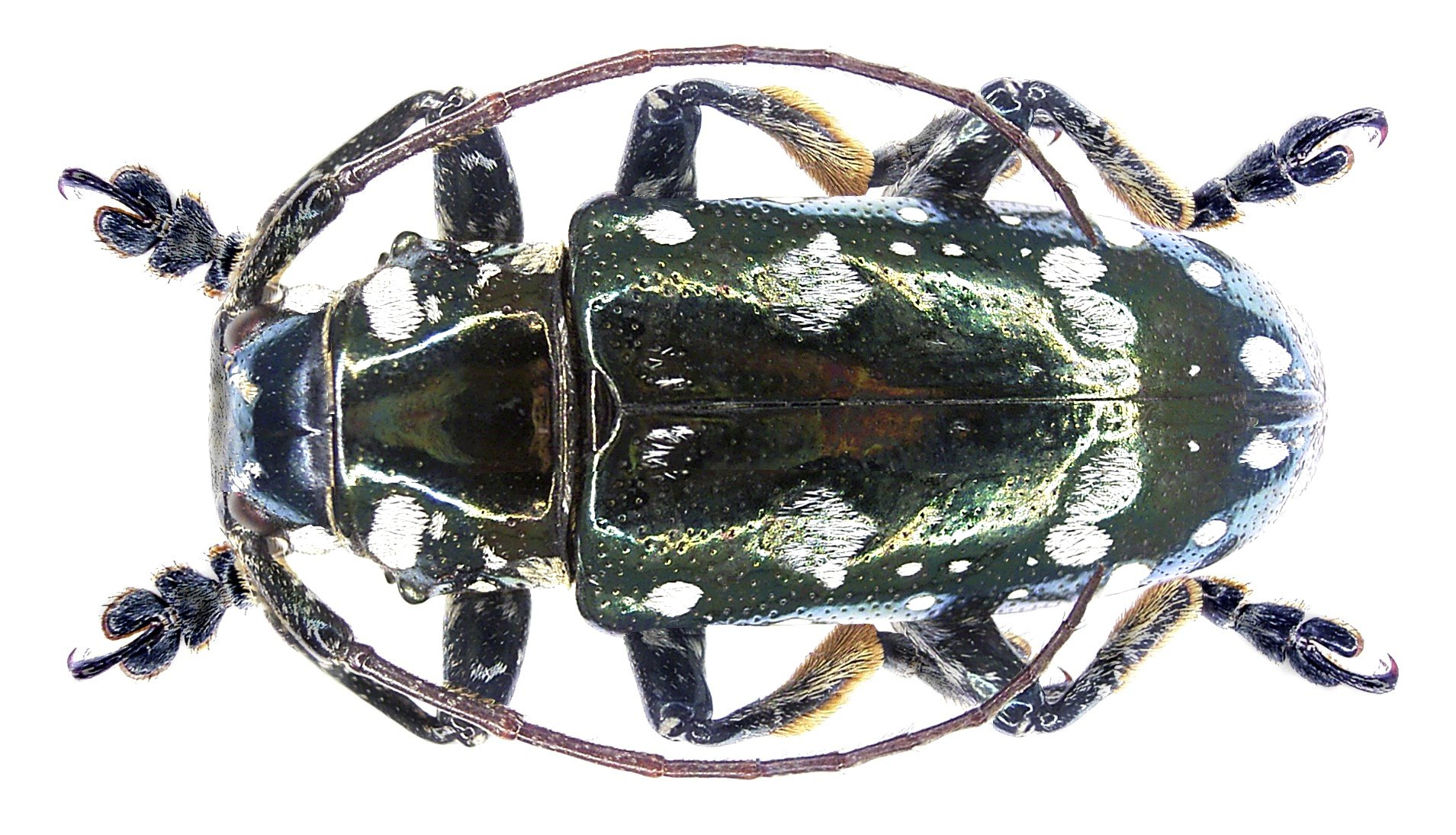
- Abryna metallica

Scientific classification
- Kingdom: Animalia
- Phylum: Arthropoda
- Class: Insecta
- Order: Coleoptera
- Suborder: Polyphaga
- Infraorder: Cucujiformia
- Family: Cerambycidae
- Subfamily: Lamiinae
- Tribe: Pteropliini; Thomson, 1860

= Pteropliini =

Tribe of beetles

Pteropliini is a tribe of longhorn beetles of the subfamily Lamiinae.

== Taxonomy ==
- Abaraeus Jordan, 1903
- Abryna Newman, 1842
- Acanthetaxalus Breuning, 1961
- Acronia Westwood, 1863
- Agniolophia Breuning, 1938
- Albapomecyna Breuning, 1980
- Alidopsis Breuning, 1954
- Alidus Gahan, 1893
- Anaches Pascoe, 1865
- Anobrium Belon, 1902
- Aprophata Pascoe, 1862
- Ataxia Haldeman, 1847
- Atybe Pascoe, 1864
- Baraeus Thomson, 1858
- Batrachorhina Chevrolat, 1842
- Brachyale Breuning, 1963
- Cairnsia Blackburn, 1895
- Callimetopus Blanchard, 1853
- Catafimbria Aurivillius, 1922
- Cenodocus J. Thomson, 1864
- Cicatripraonetha Breuning, 1980
- Cobria Pascoe, 1865
- Corrhenes Pascoe, 1865
- Corrhenispia Breuning, 1938
- Corrhenodes Breuning, 1942
- Cristodesisa Breuning, 1959
- Cryptocranium Audinet-Serville, 1835
- Cubilia Jordan, 1897
- Cubilioides Breuning, 1940
- Cyardium Pascoe, 1866
- Cyphoscyla Thomson, 1868
- Dasyerrus Pascoe, 1865
- Daxata Pascoe, 1864
- Demodioides Breuning, 1947
- Depsages Pascoe, 1865
- Desisa Pascoe, 1865
- Desisella Breuning, 1942
- Desisopsis Hüdepohl, 1995
- Diexia Pascoe, 1865
- Dystasia Pascoe, 1864
- Dystasiopsis Breuning & de Jong, 1941
- Eczemotellus Heller, 1924
- Eczemotes Pascoe, 1864
- Eczemothea Schwarzer, 1926
- Egesina Pascoe, 1864
- Emphytoecia
- Emphytoeciosoma Melzer, 1934
- Eosthenias Breuning, 1961
- Epectasis Bates, 1866
- Epopaea Thomson, 1864
- Epopea Thomson, 1864
- Esaete Galileo & Martins, 2002
- Esthlogena Thomson, 1864
- Esthlogenopsis Breuning, 1942
- Etaxalus Pascoe, 1865
- Exarrhenodes Breuning, 1938
- Exarrhenus Pascoe, 1864
- Falsoprosoplus Breuning, 1974
- Falsoterinaea Matsushita, 1938
- Falsozorilispe Breuning, 1943
- Faustabryna Breuning, 1961
- Gibbomesosella Pic, 1932
- Grammoechus J. Thomson, 1864
- Hathliodes Pascoe, 1866
- Hathliolophia Breuning, 1959
- Heterotaxalus Heller, 1926
- Ischioplites Thomson, 1864
- Ischnia Jordan, 1903
- Latabryna Hüdepohl, 1990
- Leptomesosella Breuning, 1939
- Lychrosimorphus Pic, 1925
- Macropraonetha Breuning, 1961
- Marmylaris Pascoe, 1866
- Menyllus Pascoe, 1864
- Mesiphiastus Breuning, 1959
- Mesosella Bates, 1884
- Metagnoma Aurivillius, 1925
- Micropraonetha Breuning, 1939
- Milothris Dejean, 1835
- Mimabryna Breuning, 1938
- Mimacronia Vives, 2009
- Mimaspurgus Breuning, 1957
- Mimatossa Breuning, 1943
- Mimectatosia Breuning, 1959
- Mimiphiastus Breuning, 1978
- Mimischnia Breuning, 1971
- Mimodesisa Breuning & de Jong, 1941
- Mimomenyllus Breuning, 1973
- Mimoniphona Breuning, 1940
- Mimoprosoplus Breuning, 1970
- Mimosaperdopsis Breuning, 1959
- Mimosthenias Breuning, 1938
- Mimotropidema Breuning, 1958
- Mindanaona Özdikmen, 2008
- Mispila Pascoe, 1864
- Mispilodes Breuning, 1938
- Mispilopsis Breuning, 1938
- Moron Pascoe, 1858
- Mussardia Breuning, 1959
- Nipholophia Gressitt, 1951
- Niphona Mulsant, 1839
- Niphonatossa Breuning, 1967
- Niphopterolophia Breuning, 1964
- Niphosoma Breuning, 1943
- Niphotragulus Kolbe, 1894
- Niphovelleda Breuning, 1940
- Notocorrhenes Breuning, 1959
- Ophthalmocydrus Aurivillius, 1925
- Parabryna Hüdepohl, 1995
- Paracoedomea Breuning, 1942
- Paracomeron Heller, 1913
- Paracorrhenes Breuning, 1978
- Paradaxata Breuning, 1938
- Paradesisa Breuning, 1938
- Paradiexia Heller, 1923
- Paralophia Aurivillius, 1924
- Paramenyllus Breuning, 1938
- Paramesosella Breuning, 1940
- Paramispila Breuning, 1959
- Paramispilopsis Breuning, 1947
- Paramoron Aurivillius, 1908
- Paramussardia Breuning, 1965
- Paramussardiana Breuning, 1979
- Paranaches Breuning, 1959
- Paraniphona Breuning, 1970
- Parapeleconus Breuning, 1970
- Paraphemone Gressitt, 1935
- Pararhytiphora Breuning, 1938
- Parastesilea Breuning, 1959
- Parasthenias Breuning, 1938
- Paratybe Téocchi & Sudre, 2003
- Parazosmotes Breuning, 1959
- Parepectasoides Breuning, 1979
- Paretaxalus Breuning, 1938
- Parexarrhenus Breuning, 1938
- Penthea Laporte de Castelanu, 1840
- Pentheopraonetha Breuning, 1960
- Phemonoides Breuning, 1940
- Phemonopsis Breuning, 1948
- Phesates Pascoe, 1865
- Phesatiodes Hüdepohl, 1995
- Piliranova Breuning, 1960
- Platycranium Aurivillius, 1917
- Prosoplus Blanchard, 1853
- Protorhopala Thomson, 1860
- Pseudabryna Schultze, 1916
- Pseudalidus Breuning, 1959
- Pseudaprophata Breuning, 1961
- Pseudelasma Breuning, 1968
- Pseudeuclea Schwarzer, 1931
- Pseudodoliops Breuning, 1947
- Pseudolophia Breuning, 1938
- Pseudomenyllus Breuning, 1970
- Pseudomiccolamia Pic, 1916
- Pseudomoron Breuning, 1965
- Pseudomussardia Breuning, 1974
- Pseudoparmena Breuning, 1956
- Pseudotaxalus Breuning, 1938
- Pterolamia Breuning, 1942
- Pterolophia Newman, 1842
- Pteroplius Lepeletier & Audinet-Serville in Lacordaire, 1830
- Pterotragula Teocchi, 1991
- Rhaphiptera Audinet-Serville, 1835
- Rhaphipteroides Touroult & Tavakilian, 2007
- Rhytiphora Audinet-Serville, 1835
- Scaposodus Breuning, 1961
- Sesiosa Pascoe, 1865
- Similosodus McKeown, 1945
- Sodopsis Breuning, 1961
- Soridopsis Breuning, 1940
- Sotades Pascoe, 1864
- Spinegesina Breuning, 1974
- Spinetaxalus Breuning, 1981
- Spinopraonetha Breuning, 1960
- Spinosodus Breuning & de Jong, 1941
- Squamosaperdopsis Breuning, 1959
- Stephanomenyllus Tavakilian & Jiroux, 2015
- Stesilea Pascoe, 1865
- Sthenias Laporte de Castelnau, 1840
- Sybropis Pascoe, 1885
- Sybropraonetha Breuning, 1960
- Symphyletes Newman, 1842
- Synelasma Pascoe, 1858
- Synixais Aurivillius, 1911
- Thaumasesthes Fairmaire, 1894
- Thita Aurivillius, 1914
- Tigranella Breuning, 1940
- Tricheczemotes Breuning, 1938
- Trichepectasis Breuning, 1940
- Trichohathliodes Breuning, 1959
- Tricholophia Breuning, 1938
- Trichoniphona Breuning, 1968
- Trichopenthea Breuning, 1959
- Trichoprosoplus Breuning, 1961
- Trichopterolophia Breuning, 1960
- Trichovelleda Breuning, 1970
- Tuberculetaxalus Breuning, 1980
- Xiphohathlia Breuning, 1961
- Xiphotheata Pascoe, 1864
- Xynenon Pascoe, 1865
- Zaeera Pascoe, 1865
- Zaeeroides Breuning, 1938
- Zaeeropsis Breuning, 1943
- Zosmotes Pascoe, 1865
- Zygrita Thomson, 1860
