= Niphotragulus batesi =

Scientific classification
- Domain: Eukaryota
- Kingdom: Animalia
- Phylum: Arthropoda
- Class: Insecta
- Order: Coleoptera
- Suborder: Polyphaga
- Infraorder: Cucujiformia
- Family: Cerambycidae
- Tribe: Pteropliini
- Genus: Niphotragulus
- Species: N. batesi

Binomial name
- Niphotragulus batesi Kolbe, 1894

Species of beetle

Niphotragulus batesi is a species of beetle in the family Cerambycidae. It was described by Kolbe in 1894.
