= Anobrium simplicis =

Scientific classification
- Domain: Eukaryota
- Kingdom: Animalia
- Phylum: Arthropoda
- Class: Insecta
- Order: Coleoptera
- Suborder: Polyphaga
- Infraorder: Cucujiformia
- Family: Cerambycidae
- Tribe: Pteropliini
- Genus: Anobrium
- Species: A. simplicis

Binomial name
- Anobrium simplicis Galileo & Martins, 2002

Species of beetle

Anobrium simplicis is a species of beetle in the family Cerambycidae. It was described by Galileo and Martins in 2002. It is known from Brazil.
