= Thita philippinensis =

Scientific classification
- Kingdom: Animalia
- Phylum: Arthropoda
- Class: Insecta
- Order: Coleoptera
- Suborder: Polyphaga
- Infraorder: Cucujiformia
- Family: Cerambycidae
- Subfamily: Lamiinae
- Tribe: Pteropliini
- Genus: Thita
- Species: T. philippinensis

Binomial name
- Thita philippinensis Breuning, 1973

Species of beetle

Thita philippinensis is a species in the longhorn beetle family Cerambycidae, found in the Philippines. It was described by Stephan von Breuning in 1973.
