= Cryptocranium cazieri =

Scientific classification
- Domain: Eukaryota
- Kingdom: Animalia
- Phylum: Arthropoda
- Class: Insecta
- Order: Coleoptera
- Suborder: Polyphaga
- Infraorder: Cucujiformia
- Family: Cerambycidae
- Tribe: Pteropliini
- Genus: Cryptocranium
- Species: C. cazieri

Binomial name
- Cryptocranium cazieri Lane, 1958

Synonyms
- Cryptocranium gounellei Breuning, 1980; Ornatodesisa pulchra Breuning, 1961

Species of beetle

Cryptocranium cazieri is a species of beetle in the family Cerambycidae. It was described by Lane in 1958. It is known from Peru and Brazil.
