= Thita glauca =

Scientific classification
- Kingdom: Animalia
- Phylum: Arthropoda
- Class: Insecta
- Order: Coleoptera
- Suborder: Polyphaga
- Infraorder: Cucujiformia
- Family: Cerambycidae
- Subfamily: Lamiinae
- Tribe: Pteropliini
- Genus: Thita
- Species: T. glauca

Binomial name
- Thita glauca Aurivillius, 1914

Species of beetle

Thita glauca is a species of beetle in the family Cerambycidae. It was described by Per Olof Christopher Aurivillius in 1914. It is known from Borneo and Malaysia.
