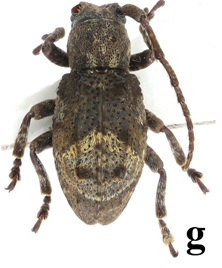

Scientific classification
- Domain: Eukaryota
- Kingdom: Animalia
- Phylum: Arthropoda
- Class: Insecta
- Order: Coleoptera
- Suborder: Polyphaga
- Infraorder: Cucujiformia
- Family: Cerambycidae
- Tribe: Pteropliini
- Genus: Pterolamia
- Species: P. quadricristata

Binomial name
- Pterolamia quadricristata Xie, 2024

= Pterolamia quadricristata =

Species of beetle

Pterolamia quadricristata is a species of beetle of the Cerambycidae family. This species is found in China (Hunan).

Adults have a mostly dark brown body, with dark brown and greyish-yellow hairs. These hairs are greyish-brown on the elytra.

== Etymology ==
The name of the species is derived from Latin quadri- and cristata and refers to the elytra have four conspicuously raised short ridges near the base and the middle.
