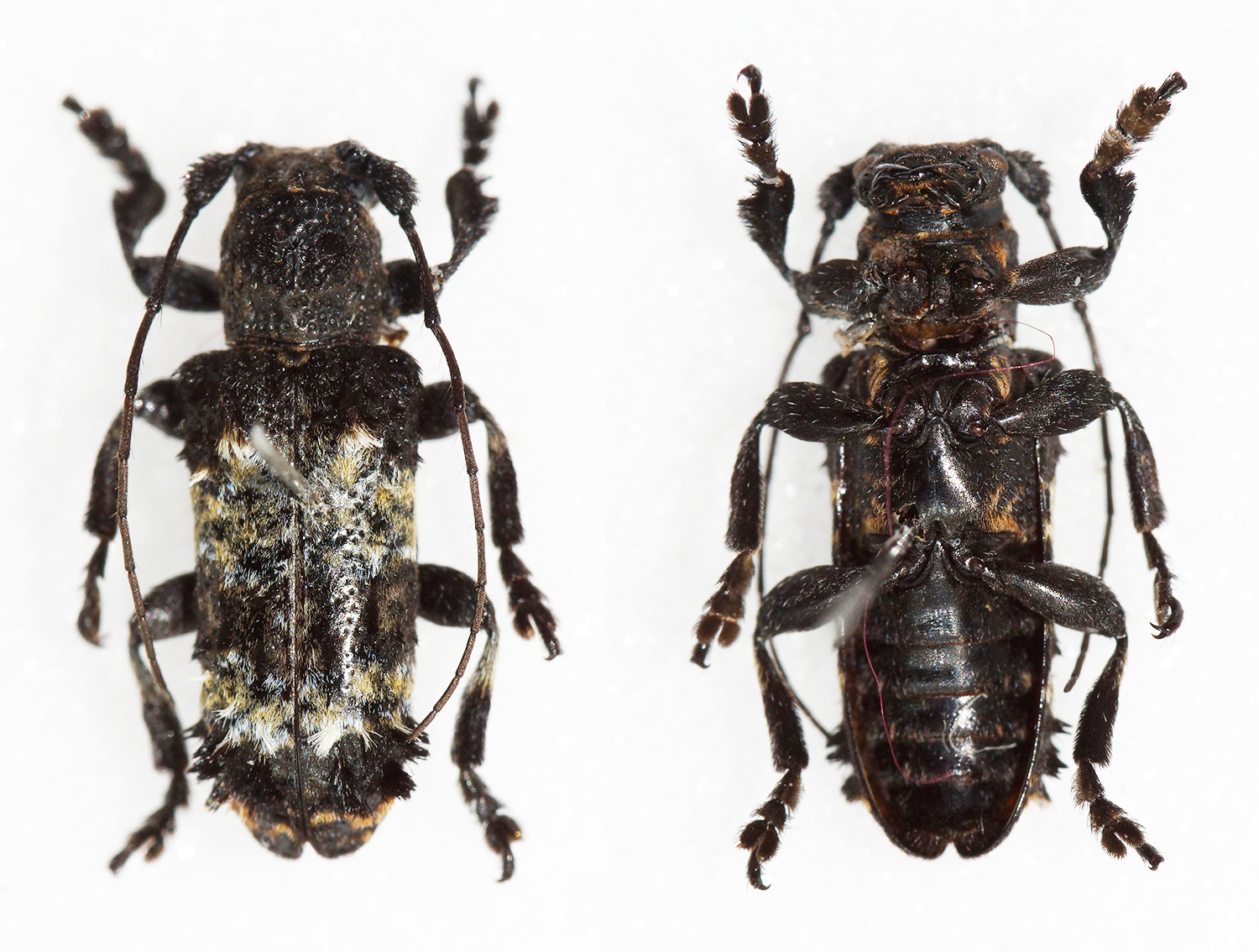

Scientific classification
- Domain: Eukaryota
- Kingdom: Animalia
- Phylum: Arthropoda
- Class: Insecta
- Order: Coleoptera
- Suborder: Polyphaga
- Infraorder: Cucujiformia
- Family: Cerambycidae
- Tribe: Pteropliini
- Genus: Atybe
- Species: A. plantii

Binomial name
- Atybe plantii Pascoe, 1864

Synonyms
- Atybe nigritarsis Pascoe, 1888; Atybe planti (Pascoe) Harold, 1868 (misspelling)

= Atybe plantii =

Species of beetle

Atybe plantii is a species of beetle in the family Cerambycidae. It was described by Francis Polkinghorne Pascoe in 1864. It is known from Madagascar.
