= Mimomenyllus =

Scientific classification
- Kingdom: Animalia
- Phylum: Arthropoda
- Class: Insecta
- Order: Coleoptera
- Suborder: Polyphaga
- Infraorder: Cucujiformia
- Family: Cerambycidae
- Subfamily: Lamiinae
- Tribe: Pteropliini
- Genus: Mimomenyllus; Breuning, 1973

Genus of beetles

Mimomenyllus is a genus of longhorn beetles of the subfamily Lamiinae, containing the following species:

- Mimomenyllus aruensis Breuning, 1973
- Mimomenyllus ochreithorax Breuning, 1978
- Mimomenyllus quadricostulatus Breuning, 1980
