= Ischioplites salomonum =

Scientific classification
- Domain: Eukaryota
- Kingdom: Animalia
- Phylum: Arthropoda
- Class: Insecta
- Order: Coleoptera
- Suborder: Polyphaga
- Infraorder: Cucujiformia
- Family: Cerambycidae
- Tribe: Pteropliini
- Genus: Ischioplites
- Species: I. salomonum

Binomial name
- Ischioplites salomonum Breuning, 1938

Species of insect

Ischioplites salomonum is a species of beetle in the family Cerambycidae. It was described by Stephan von Breuning in 1938.
