= Anobrium oberthueri =

Scientific classification
- Domain: Eukaryota
- Kingdom: Animalia
- Phylum: Arthropoda
- Class: Insecta
- Order: Coleoptera
- Suborder: Polyphaga
- Infraorder: Cucujiformia
- Family: Cerambycidae
- Tribe: Pteropliini
- Genus: Anobrium
- Species: A. oberthueri

Binomial name
- Anobrium oberthueri Belon, 1902

Synonyms
- Anobrium oberthüri Belon, 1902

Species of beetle

Anobrium oberthueri is a species of beetle in the family Cerambycidae. It was described by Belon in 1902. It is known from Ecuador, Bolivia and Brazil.
