= Anobrium minimum =

Scientific classification
- Domain: Eukaryota
- Kingdom: Animalia
- Phylum: Arthropoda
- Class: Insecta
- Order: Coleoptera
- Suborder: Polyphaga
- Infraorder: Cucujiformia
- Family: Cerambycidae
- Tribe: Pteropliini
- Genus: Anobrium
- Species: A. minimum

Binomial name
- Anobrium minimum Martins, Galileo & de Oliveira, 2009

Species of beetle

Anobrium minimum is a species of beetle in the family Cerambycidae. It was described by Martins, Galileo and de Oliveira in 2009. It is known from Brazil.
