= Cryptocranium laterale =

Scientific classification
- Domain: Eukaryota
- Kingdom: Animalia
- Phylum: Arthropoda
- Class: Insecta
- Order: Coleoptera
- Suborder: Polyphaga
- Infraorder: Cucujiformia
- Family: Cerambycidae
- Tribe: Pteropliini
- Genus: Cryptocranium
- Species: C. laterale

Binomial name
- Cryptocranium laterale Audinet-Serville, 1835

Species of beetle

Cryptocranium laterale is a species of beetle in the family Cerambycidae. It was described by Audinet-Serville in 1835. It is known from Bolivia and Brazil.
