= Cristodesisa =

Scientific classification
- Domain: Eukaryota
- Kingdom: Animalia
- Phylum: Arthropoda
- Class: Insecta
- Order: Coleoptera
- Suborder: Polyphaga
- Infraorder: Cucujiformia
- Family: Cerambycidae
- Tribe: Pteropliini
- Genus: Cristodesisa

Genus of beetles

Cristodesisa is a genus of longhorn beetles of the subfamily Lamiinae, containing the following species:

- Cristodesisa perakensis Breuning, 1959
- Cristodesisa vicina Breuning, 1972
