= Niphotragulus longicollis =

Scientific classification
- Kingdom: Animalia
- Phylum: Arthropoda
- Class: Insecta
- Order: Coleoptera
- Suborder: Polyphaga
- Infraorder: Cucujiformia
- Family: Cerambycidae
- Genus: Niphotragulus
- Species: N. longicollis

Binomial name
- Niphotragulus longicollis Breuning, 1942

Species of beetle

Niphotragulus longicollis is a species of beetle in the family Cerambycidae. It was described by Stephan von Breuning in 1942.
