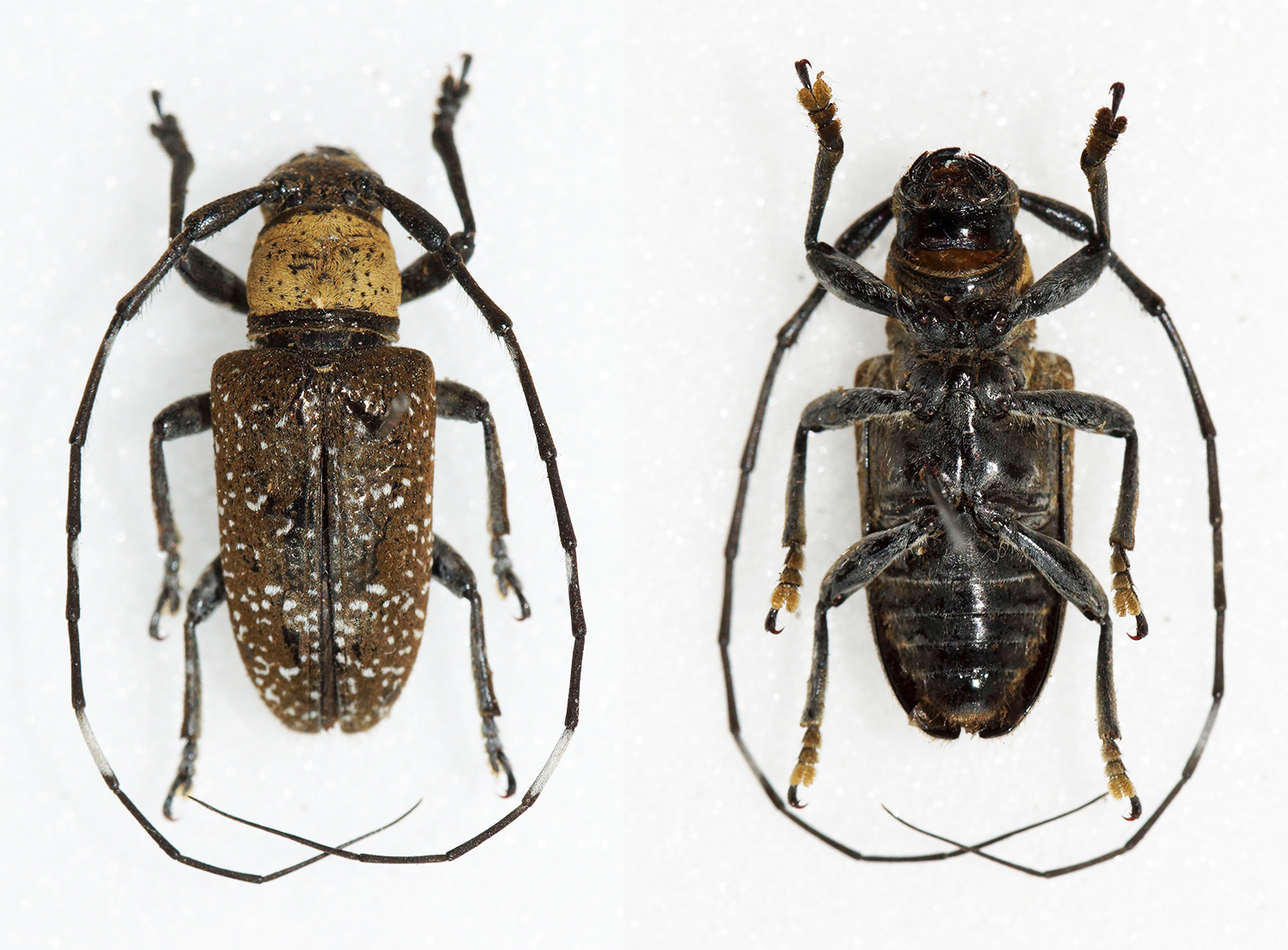
- Eczemotellus subtilipictus

Scientific classification
- Domain: Eukaryota
- Kingdom: Animalia
- Phylum: Arthropoda
- Class: Insecta
- Order: Coleoptera
- Suborder: Polyphaga
- Infraorder: Cucujiformia
- Family: Cerambycidae
- Tribe: Pteropliini
- Genus: Eczemotellus
- Species: E. subtilipectus

Binomial name
- Eczemotellus subtilipectus Heller, 1924

= Eczemotellus =

Genus of beetles

Eczemotellus is a genus of beetle in the family Cerambycidae. Its only species is Eczemotellus subtilipectus. It was described by Heller in 1924.
