= Dasyerrus =

Scientific classification
- Domain: Eukaryota
- Kingdom: Animalia
- Phylum: Arthropoda
- Class: Insecta
- Order: Coleoptera
- Suborder: Polyphaga
- Infraorder: Cucujiformia
- Family: Cerambycidae
- Tribe: Pteropliini
- Genus: Dasyerrus
- Species: D. pilosus

Binomial name
- Dasyerrus pilosus Pascoe, 1865

Genus of beetles

Dasyerrus is a genus of beetle in the family Cerambycidae. Its only species is Dasyerrus pilosus. It was described by Francis Polkinghorne Pascoe in 1865.
