= Phesates =

Scientific classification
- Kingdom: Animalia
- Phylum: Arthropoda
- Class: Insecta
- Order: Coleoptera
- Suborder: Polyphaga
- Infraorder: Cucujiformia
- Family: Cerambycidae
- Tribe: Pteropliini
- Genus: Phesates

Genus of beetles

Phesates is a genus of longhorn beetles of the subfamily Lamiinae, containing the following species:

- Phesates ferrugatus Pascoe, 1865
- Phesates uniformis Breuning, 1938
