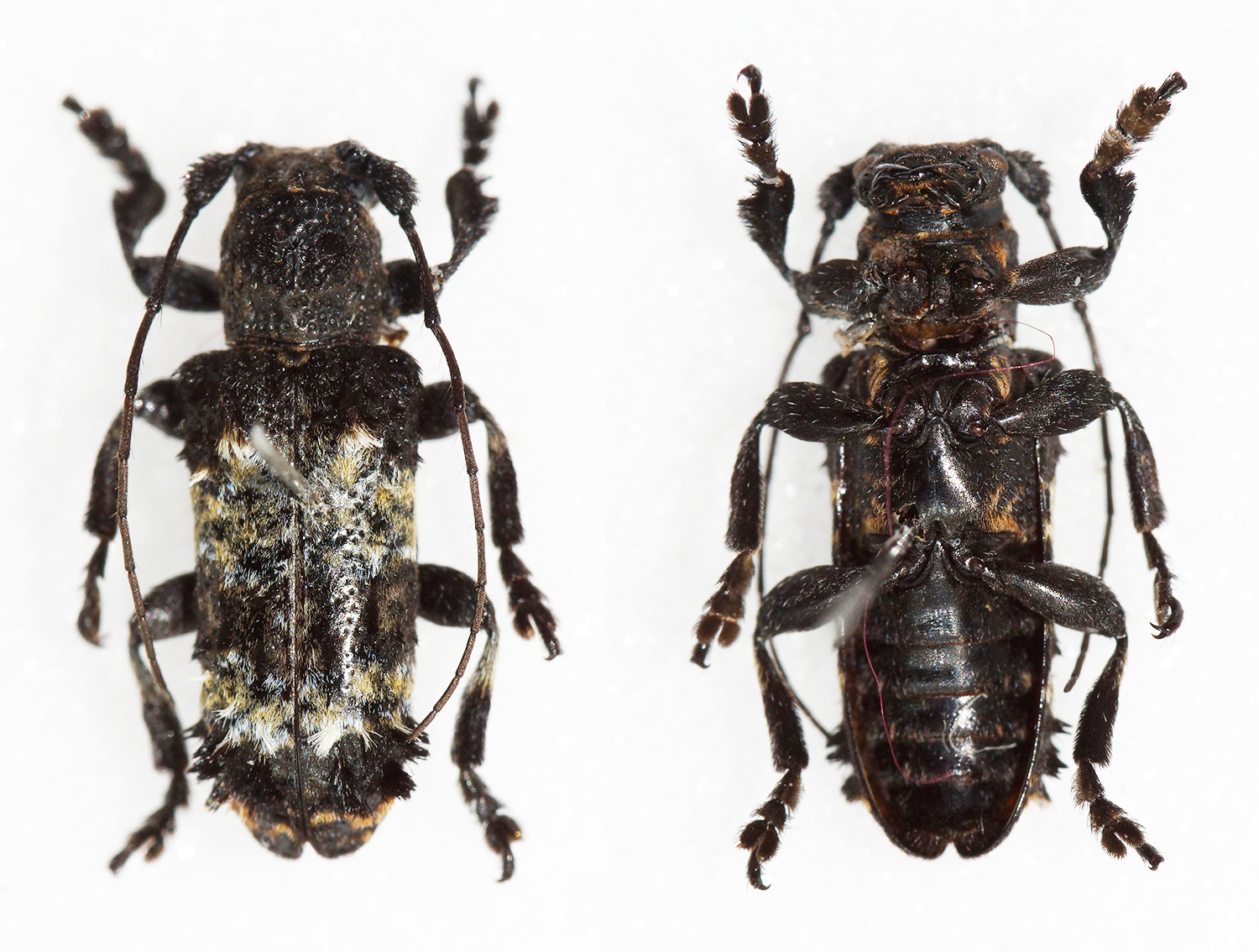

Scientific classification
- Domain: Eukaryota
- Kingdom: Animalia
- Phylum: Arthropoda
- Class: Insecta
- Order: Coleoptera
- Suborder: Polyphaga
- Infraorder: Cucujiformia
- Family: Cerambycidae
- Tribe: Pteropliini
- Genus: Atybe; Pascoe, 1864

= Atybe =

Genus of beetles

Atybe is a genus of longhorn beetles of the subfamily Lamiinae, containing the following species:

- Atybe nyassensis Breuning, 1970
- Atybe plantii Pascoe, 1864
