= Niphotragulus strandi =

Scientific classification
- Kingdom: Animalia
- Phylum: Arthropoda
- Class: Insecta
- Order: Coleoptera
- Suborder: Polyphaga
- Infraorder: Cucujiformia
- Family: Cerambycidae
- Genus: Niphotragulus
- Species: N. strandi

Binomial name
- Niphotragulus strandi Breuning, 1943

Species of beetle

Niphotragulus strandi is a species of beetle in the family Cerambycidae. It was described by Stephan von Breuning in 1943.
