= Leptomesosella =

Scientific classification
- Kingdom: Animalia
- Phylum: Arthropoda
- Class: Insecta
- Order: Coleoptera
- Suborder: Polyphaga
- Infraorder: Cucujiformia
- Family: Cerambycidae
- Tribe: Pteropliini
- Genus: Leptomesosella; Breuning, 1939
- Species: L. uniformis

Binomial name
- Leptomesosella uniformis Breuning, 1939

Genus of beetles

Leptomesosella is a genus of beetle in the family Cerambycidae. Its only species is Leptomesosella uniformis. It was described by Stephan von Breuning in 1939.

It's 12 mm long and 3 2/3 mm wide, and its type locality is Pusa, India.
