= Milothris =

Scientific classification
- Domain: Eukaryota
- Kingdom: Animalia
- Phylum: Arthropoda
- Class: Insecta
- Order: Coleoptera
- Suborder: Polyphaga
- Infraorder: Cucujiformia
- Family: Cerambycidae
- Tribe: Pteropliini
- Genus: Milothris
- Species: M. marmorea

Binomial name
- Milothris marmorea (Schönherr, 1817)

Genus of beetles

Milothris is a genus of beetle in the family Cerambycidae. Its only species is Milothris marmorea. It was described by Schönherr in 1817.
