= Gibbomesosella nodulosa =

Scientific classification
- Kingdom: Animalia
- Phylum: Arthropoda
- Class: Insecta
- Order: Coleoptera
- Suborder: Polyphaga
- Infraorder: Cucujiformia
- Family: Cerambycidae
- Genus: Gibbomesosella
- Species: G. nodulosa

Binomial name
- Gibbomesosella nodulosa (Pic, 1932)

Synonyms
- Mesosella nodulosa Pic, 1932

Species of beetle

Gibbomesosella nodulosa is a species of beetle in the family Cerambycidae. It was described by Maurice Pic in 1932. It is known from Vietnam.
