= Cristodesisa vicina =

Scientific classification
- Kingdom: Animalia
- Phylum: Arthropoda
- Class: Insecta
- Order: Coleoptera
- Suborder: Polyphaga
- Infraorder: Cucujiformia
- Family: Cerambycidae
- Genus: Cristodesisa
- Species: C. vicina

Binomial name
- Cristodesisa vicina Breuning, 1972

Species of beetle

Cristodesisa vicina is a species of beetle in the family Cerambycidae. It was described by Stephan von Breuning in 1972. It is known from Malaysia.
