= Catafimbria =

Scientific classification
- Domain: Eukaryota
- Kingdom: Animalia
- Phylum: Arthropoda
- Class: Insecta
- Order: Coleoptera
- Suborder: Polyphaga
- Infraorder: Cucujiformia
- Family: Cerambycidae
- Tribe: Pteropliini
- Genus: Catafimbria
- Species: C. boliviana

Binomial name
- Catafimbria boliviana (Belon, 1896)

Genus of beetles

Catafimbria is a genus of beetle in the family Cerambycidae. Its only species is Catafimbria boliviana. It was described by Belon in 1896.
