= Niphotragulus leonensis =

Scientific classification
- Kingdom: Animalia
- Phylum: Arthropoda
- Class: Insecta
- Order: Coleoptera
- Suborder: Polyphaga
- Infraorder: Cucujiformia
- Family: Cerambycidae
- Genus: Niphotragulus
- Species: N. leonensis

Binomial name
- Niphotragulus leonensis Breuning, 1970

Species of beetle

Niphotragulus leonensis is a species of beetle in the family Cerambycidae. It was described by Stephan von Breuning in 1970.
