= Mimosaperdopsis =

Scientific classification
- Kingdom: Animalia
- Phylum: Arthropoda
- Class: Insecta
- Order: Coleoptera
- Suborder: Polyphaga
- Infraorder: Cucujiformia
- Family: Cerambycidae
- Tribe: Pteropliini
- Genus: Mimosaperdopsis; Breuning, 1959
- Species: M. apiculata

Binomial name
- Mimosaperdopsis apiculata (Aurivillius, 1916)

Genus of beetles

Mimosaperdopsis is a monotypic beetle genus in the family Cerambycidae described by Stephan von Breuning in 1959. Its single species, Mimosaperdopsis apiculata, was described by Per Olof Christopher Aurivillius in 1916.
