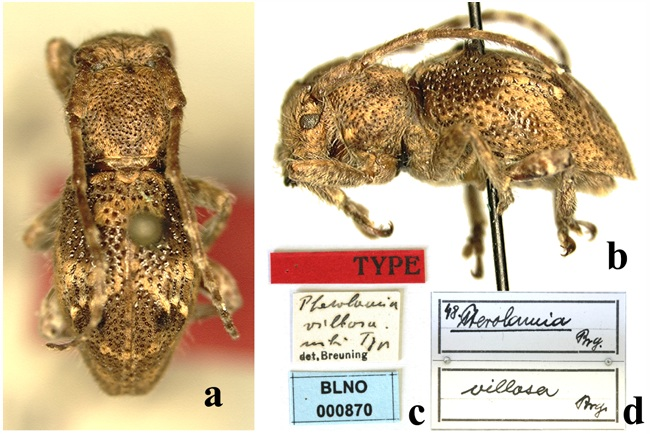

Scientific classification
- Kingdom: Animalia
- Phylum: Arthropoda
- Class: Insecta
- Order: Coleoptera
- Suborder: Polyphaga
- Infraorder: Cucujiformia
- Family: Cerambycidae
- Genus: Pterolamia
- Species: P. strandi

Binomial name
- Pterolamia strandi Breuning, 1942

= Pterolamia strandi =

Genus of beetles

Pterolamia strandi is a species of beetle in the family Cerambycidae. It has long been the only species in the genus Pterolamia. It was described by Stephan von Breuning in 1942. This species is found in China (Hainan).

== Taxonomy ==
Bezark (2024) cited the holotype images of P. villosa Breuning under the name P. strandi in his Photographic Catalog of the Cerambycidae of the World. However, no record of P. villosa Breuning can be found in formal publications, indicating that this name was never formally published and is therefore a nomen nudum. It is believed that when Breuning identified this specimen, he initially named the new species Pterolamia villosa, but later published it under the name Pterolamia strandi.
