= Pararhytiphora nigropunctata =

Scientific classification
- Kingdom: Animalia
- Phylum: Arthropoda
- Class: Insecta
- Order: Coleoptera
- Suborder: Polyphaga
- Infraorder: Cucujiformia
- Family: Cerambycidae
- Genus: Pararhytiphora
- Species: P. nigropunctata

Binomial name
- Pararhytiphora nigropunctata Breuning, 1938

Synonyms
- Rhytiphora nigropunctata (Breuning) McKeown, 1947

Species of beetle

Pararhytiphora nigropunctata is a species of beetle in the family Cerambycidae. It was described by Stephan von Breuning in 1938.
