= Corrhenodes =

Scientific classification
- Domain: Eukaryota
- Kingdom: Animalia
- Phylum: Arthropoda
- Class: Insecta
- Order: Coleoptera
- Suborder: Polyphaga
- Infraorder: Cucujiformia
- Family: Cerambycidae
- Tribe: Pteropliini
- Genus: Corrhenodes

Genus of beetles

Corrhenodes is a genus of longhorn beetles of the subfamily Lamiinae, containing the following species:

- Corrhenodes gracilis Breuning, 1942
- Corrhenodes marmoratus Breuning, 1973
