= Paramussardia =

Scientific classification
- Kingdom: Animalia
- Phylum: Arthropoda
- Class: Insecta
- Order: Coleoptera
- Suborder: Polyphaga
- Infraorder: Cucujiformia
- Family: Cerambycidae
- Tribe: Pteropliini
- Genus: Paramussardia

Genus of beetles

Paramussardia is a genus of longhorn beetles of the subfamily Lamiinae, containing the following species:

- Paramussardia bothai Breuning, 1981
- Paramussardia flavoscutellata Breuning, 1965
