= Dystasiopsis spiniscapus =

Scientific classification
- Kingdom: Animalia
- Phylum: Arthropoda
- Class: Insecta
- Order: Coleoptera
- Suborder: Polyphaga
- Infraorder: Cucujiformia
- Family: Cerambycidae
- Genus: Dystasiopsis
- Species: D. spiniscapus

Binomial name
- Dystasiopsis spiniscapus Breuning & de Jong, 1941

Species of beetle

Dystasiopsis spiniscapus is a species of beetle belonging to the family Cerambycidae. It was described by Stephan von Breuning and de Jong in 1941.
