= Niphosoma compacta =

Scientific classification
- Kingdom: Animalia
- Phylum: Arthropoda
- Class: Insecta
- Order: Coleoptera
- Suborder: Polyphaga
- Infraorder: Cucujiformia
- Family: Cerambycidae
- Genus: Niphosoma
- Species: N. compacta

Binomial name
- Niphosoma compacta Breuning, 1943

Species of beetle

Niphosoma compacta is a species of beetle in the family Cerambycidae. It was described by Stephan von Breuning in 1943.
