= Trichohathliodes =

Scientific classification
- Kingdom: Animalia
- Phylum: Arthropoda
- Class: Insecta
- Order: Coleoptera
- Suborder: Polyphaga
- Infraorder: Cucujiformia
- Family: Cerambycidae
- Tribe: Pteropliini
- Genus: Trichohathliodes; Breuning, 1959
- Species: T. molitorius

Binomial name
- Trichohathliodes molitorius (Aurivillius, 1917)

Genus of beetles

Trichohathliodes is a monotypic beetle genus in the family Cerambycidae described by Stephan von Breuning in 1959. Its only species, Trichohathliodes molitorius, was described by Per Olof Christopher Aurivillius in 1917.
