= Ophthalmocydrus =

Scientific classification
- Domain: Eukaryota
- Kingdom: Animalia
- Phylum: Arthropoda
- Class: Insecta
- Order: Coleoptera
- Suborder: Polyphaga
- Infraorder: Cucujiformia
- Family: Cerambycidae
- Tribe: Pteropliini
- Genus: Ophthalmocydrus; Aurivillius, 1925
- Species: O. semiorbifer

Binomial name
- Ophthalmocydrus semiorbifer Aurivillius, 1925

Genus of beetles

Ophthalmocydrus is a monotypic species of beetle in the family Cerambycidae described by Per Olof Christopher Aurivillius in 1925.
