= Pterolamia =

Scientific classification
- Kingdom: Animalia
- Phylum: Arthropoda
- Class: Insecta
- Order: Coleoptera
- Suborder: Polyphaga
- Infraorder: Cucujiformia
- Family: Cerambycidae
- Subfamily: Lamiinae
- Tribe: Pteropliini
- Genus: Pterolamia; Breuning, 1942

Genus of beetles

Pterolamia is a genus of longhorn beetles of the subfamily Lamiinae, containing the following species:

- Pterolamia quadricristata Xie, 2024
- Pterolamia strandi Breuning, 1942
