= Mimotropidema =

Scientific classification
- Kingdom: Animalia
- Phylum: Arthropoda
- Class: Insecta
- Order: Coleoptera
- Suborder: Polyphaga
- Infraorder: Cucujiformia
- Family: Cerambycidae
- Tribe: Pteropliini
- Genus: Mimotropidema

Genus of beetles

Mimotropidema is a genus of longhorn beetles of the subfamily Lamiinae, containing the following species:

- Mimotropidema chrysocephala Breuning, 1957
- Mimotropidema nigerrima Breuning, 1964
