= Menyllus (beetle) =

Scientific classification
- Domain: Eukaryota
- Kingdom: Animalia
- Phylum: Arthropoda
- Class: Insecta
- Order: Coleoptera
- Suborder: Polyphaga
- Infraorder: Cucujiformia
- Family: Cerambycidae
- Subfamily: Lamiinae
- Tribe: Pteropliini
- Genus: Menyllus; Pascoe, 1864

Genus of beetles

Menyllus is a genus of longhorn beetles of the subfamily Lamiinae, containing the following species:

- Menyllus maculicornis Pascoe, 1864
- Menyllus rotundipennis Breuning, 1968
