= Anobrium =

Scientific classification
- Domain: Eukaryota
- Kingdom: Animalia
- Phylum: Arthropoda
- Class: Insecta
- Order: Coleoptera
- Suborder: Polyphaga
- Infraorder: Cucujiformia
- Family: Cerambycidae
- Tribe: Pteropliini
- Genus: Anobrium; Belon, 1902

Genus of beetles

Anobrium is a genus of longhorn beetles of the subfamily Lamiinae, containing the following species:

- Anobrium fasciatum Galileo & Martins, 2002
- Anobrium fraterculum Galileo & Martins, 2002
- Anobrium leuconotum Galileo & Martins, 2002
- Anobrium luridum (Breuning, 1940)
- Anobrium minimum Martins, Galileo & de Oliveira, 2009
- Anobrium oberthueri Belon, 1902
- Anobrium punctatum Galileo & Martins, 2002
- Anobrium rugosicollis Galileo & Martins, 2002
- Anobrium simplicis Galileo & Martins, 2002
