= Pararhytiphora =

Scientific classification
- Kingdom: Animalia
- Phylum: Arthropoda
- Class: Insecta
- Order: Coleoptera
- Suborder: Polyphaga
- Infraorder: Cucujiformia
- Family: Cerambycidae
- Tribe: Pteropliini
- Genus: Pararhytiphora

Genus of beetles

Pararhytiphora is a genus of longhorn beetles of the subfamily Lamiinae, containing the following species:

- Pararhytiphora dispar (Blackburn, 1894)
- Pararhytiphora nigropunctata Breuning, 1938
- Pararhytiphora nigrosparsa Breuning, 1938
