= Gibbomesosella =

Scientific classification
- Domain: Eukaryota
- Kingdom: Animalia
- Phylum: Arthropoda
- Class: Insecta
- Order: Coleoptera
- Suborder: Polyphaga
- Infraorder: Cucujiformia
- Family: Cerambycidae
- Tribe: Pteropliini
- Genus: Gibbomesosella

Genus of beetles

Gibbomesosella is a genus of longhorn beetles of the subfamily Lamiinae, containing the following species:

- Gibbomesosella laosica Breuning, 1969
- Gibbomesosella nodulosa (Pic, 1932)
