= Paracoedomea =

Scientific classification
- Domain: Eukaryota
- Kingdom: Animalia
- Phylum: Arthropoda
- Class: Insecta
- Order: Coleoptera
- Suborder: Polyphaga
- Infraorder: Cucujiformia
- Family: Cerambycidae
- Tribe: Pteropliini
- Genus: Paracoedomea
- Species: P. strandi

Binomial name
- Paracoedomea strandi Breuning, 1942

Genus of beetles

Paracoedomea is a genus of beetle in the family Cerambycidae. Its only species is Paracoedomea strandi. It was described by Stephan von Breuning in 1942.
