= Exarrhenus =

Scientific classification
- Domain: Eukaryota
- Kingdom: Animalia
- Phylum: Arthropoda
- Class: Insecta
- Order: Coleoptera
- Suborder: Polyphaga
- Infraorder: Cucujiformia
- Family: Cerambycidae
- Tribe: Pteropliini
- Genus: Exarrhenus
- Species: E. egens

Binomial name
- Exarrhenus egens Pascoe, 1864

Genus of beetles

Exarrhenus is a genus of beetle in the family Cerambycidae. Its only species is Exarrhenus egens. It was described by Francis Polkinghorne Pascoe in 1864.
