= Cryptocranium =

Scientific classification
- Domain: Eukaryota
- Kingdom: Animalia
- Phylum: Arthropoda
- Class: Insecta
- Order: Coleoptera
- Suborder: Polyphaga
- Infraorder: Cucujiformia
- Family: Cerambycidae
- Tribe: Pteropliini
- Genus: Cryptocranium

Genus of beetles

Cryptocranium is a genus of longhorn beetles of the subfamily Lamiinae, containing the following species:

- Cryptocranium cazieri Lane, 1958
- Cryptocranium laterale Audinet-Serville, 1835
