= Phemonopsis cylindricus =

Scientific classification
- Kingdom: Animalia
- Phylum: Arthropoda
- Class: Insecta
- Order: Coleoptera
- Suborder: Polyphaga
- Infraorder: Cucujiformia
- Family: Cerambycidae
- Genus: Phemonopsis
- Species: P. cylindricus

Binomial name
- Phemonopsis cylindricus Breuning, 1948

Species of beetle

Phemonopsis cylindricus is a species of beetle in the family Cerambycidae. It was described by Stephan von Breuning in 1948.
