= Corrhenodes marmoratus =

Scientific classification
- Kingdom: Animalia
- Phylum: Arthropoda
- Class: Insecta
- Order: Coleoptera
- Suborder: Polyphaga
- Infraorder: Cucujiformia
- Family: Cerambycidae
- Genus: Corrhenodes
- Species: C. marmoratus

Binomial name
- Corrhenodes marmoratus Breuning, 1973

Species of beetle

Corrhenodes marmoratus is a species of beetle in the family Cerambycidae. It was described by Stephan von Breuning in 1973.
