= Latabryna =

Scientific classification
- Domain: Eukaryota
- Kingdom: Animalia
- Phylum: Arthropoda
- Class: Insecta
- Order: Coleoptera
- Suborder: Polyphaga
- Infraorder: Cucujiformia
- Family: Cerambycidae
- Tribe: Pteropliini
- Genus: Latabryna
- Species: L. arnaudi

Binomial name
- Latabryna arnaudi Hüdepohl, 1990

Genus of beetles

Latabryna is a genus of beetle in the family Cerambycidae. Its only species is Latabryna arnaudi. It was described by Hüdepohl in 1990.
