= Epopaea =

Scientific classification
- Domain: Eukaryota
- Kingdom: Animalia
- Phylum: Arthropoda
- Class: Insecta
- Order: Coleoptera
- Suborder: Polyphaga
- Infraorder: Cucujiformia
- Family: Cerambycidae
- Tribe: Pteropliini
- Genus: Epopaea
- Species: E. acuta

Binomial name
- Epopaea acuta Thomson, 1864

Genus of beetles

Epopaea is a genus of beetle in the family Cerambycidae. Its only species is Epopaea acuta. It was described by Thomson in 1864.
