= Menyllus rotundipennis =

Scientific classification
- Kingdom: Animalia
- Phylum: Arthropoda
- Class: Insecta
- Order: Coleoptera
- Suborder: Polyphaga
- Infraorder: Cucujiformia
- Family: Cerambycidae
- Genus: Menyllus
- Species: M. rotundipennis

Binomial name
- Menyllus rotundipennis Breuning, 1968

Species of beetle

Menyllus rotundipennis is a species of beetle in the family Cerambycidae. It was described by Stephan von Breuning in 1968.
