= Heterotaxalus =

Scientific classification
- Domain: Eukaryota
- Kingdom: Animalia
- Phylum: Arthropoda
- Class: Insecta
- Order: Coleoptera
- Suborder: Polyphaga
- Infraorder: Cucujiformia
- Family: Cerambycidae
- Tribe: Pteropliini
- Genus: Heterotaxalus
- Species: H. schwarzeri

Binomial name
- Heterotaxalus schwarzeri Heller, 1926

Genus of beetles

Heterotaxalus is a genus of beetle in the family Cerambycidae. Its only species is Heterotaxalus schwarzeri. It was described by Heller in 1926.
