= Thita (beetle) =

Scientific classification
- Domain: Eukaryota
- Kingdom: Animalia
- Phylum: Arthropoda
- Class: Insecta
- Order: Coleoptera
- Suborder: Polyphaga
- Infraorder: Cucujiformia
- Family: Cerambycidae
- Subfamily: Lamiinae
- Tribe: Pteropliini
- Genus: Thita; Aurivillius, 1914

Genus of beetles

Thita is a genus in the longhorn beetle family Cerambycidae. There are at least two described species in Thita.

== Species ==
These two species belong to the genus Thita:

- Thita glauca Aurivillius, 1914 (Borneo)
- Thita philippinensis Breuning, 1973 (Philippines)
