= Eczemothea =

Scientific classification
- Domain: Eukaryota
- Kingdom: Animalia
- Phylum: Arthropoda
- Class: Insecta
- Order: Coleoptera
- Suborder: Polyphaga
- Infraorder: Cucujiformia
- Family: Cerambycidae
- Tribe: Pteropliini
- Genus: Eczemothea
- Species: E. pustulifera

Binomial name
- Eczemothea pustulifera Schwarzer, 1926

Genus of beetles

Eczemothea is a genus of beetle in the family Cerambycidae. Its only species is Eczemothea pustulifera. It was described by Schwarzer in 1926.
