= Esaete =

Scientific classification
- Domain: Eukaryota
- Kingdom: Animalia
- Phylum: Arthropoda
- Class: Insecta
- Order: Coleoptera
- Suborder: Polyphaga
- Infraorder: Cucujiformia
- Family: Cerambycidae
- Tribe: Pteropliini
- Genus: Esaete
- Species: E. rufulus

Binomial name
- Esaete rufulus Galileo & Martins, 2002

Genus of beetles

Esaete is a genus of beetle in the family Cerambycidae. Its only species is Esaete rufulus. It was described by Galileo and Martins in 2002.
