= Niphotragulus =

Scientific classification
- Domain: Eukaryota
- Kingdom: Animalia
- Phylum: Arthropoda
- Class: Insecta
- Order: Coleoptera
- Suborder: Polyphaga
- Infraorder: Cucujiformia
- Family: Cerambycidae
- Tribe: Pteropliini
- Genus: Niphotragulus

Genus of beetles

Niphotragulus is a genus of longhorn beetles of the subfamily Lamiinae, containing the following species:

- Niphotragulus affinis Breuning, 1954
- Niphotragulus albosignatus Breuning, 1954
- Niphotragulus batesi Kolbe, 1894
- Niphotragulus delkeskampi Breuning, 1961
- Niphotragulus leonensis Breuning, 1970
- Niphotragulus longicollis Breuning, 1942
- Niphotragulus machadoi Breuning, 1970
- Niphotragulus occidentalis Breuning, 1977
- Niphotragulus strandi Breuning, 1943
