= Phesates ferrugatus =

Scientific classification
- Kingdom: Animalia
- Phylum: Arthropoda
- Class: Insecta
- Order: Coleoptera
- Suborder: Polyphaga
- Infraorder: Cucujiformia
- Family: Cerambycidae
- Genus: Phesates
- Species: P. ferrugatus

Binomial name
- Phesates ferrugatus Pascoe, 1865

Species of beetle

Phesates ferrugatus is a species of beetle in the family Cerambycidae. It was described by Francis Polkinghorne Pascoe in 1865. It is known from Borneo and Malaysia.
