= Pararhytiphora dispar =

Scientific classification
- Kingdom: Animalia
- Phylum: Arthropoda
- Class: Insecta
- Order: Coleoptera
- Suborder: Polyphaga
- Infraorder: Cucujiformia
- Family: Cerambycidae
- Genus: Pararhytiphora
- Species: P. dispar

Binomial name
- Pararhytiphora dispar (Blackburn, 1894)

Synonyms
- Rhytiphora dispar (Blackburn) McKeown, 1947; Iphiastus dispar Blackburn, 1894

Species of beetle

Pararhytiphora dispar is a species of beetle in the family Cerambycidae. It was described by Thomas Blackburn in 1894, originally under the genus Iphiastus. It is known from Australia. It contains the varietas Pararhytiphora dispar var. fasciata.
