= Sotades platypus =

Scientific classification
- Domain: Eukaryota
- Kingdom: Animalia
- Phylum: Arthropoda
- Class: Insecta
- Order: Coleoptera
- Suborder: Polyphaga
- Infraorder: Cucujiformia
- Family: Cerambycidae
- Subfamily: Lamiinae
- Tribe: Pteropliini
- Genus: Sotades
- Species: S. platypus

Binomial name
- Sotades platypus Pascoe, 1864

Synonyms
- Sotades agrestis Pascoe, 1864; Sotades caprinus Pascoe, 1864; Sotades fatidicus Pascoe, 1864

Species of beetle

Sotades platypus is a species of long-horned beetle in the family Cerambycidae, the only species in the genus Sotades. It is found in Indonesia and Papua New Guinea.
