= Mimabryna =

Scientific classification
- Domain: Eukaryota
- Kingdom: Animalia
- Phylum: Arthropoda
- Class: Insecta
- Order: Coleoptera
- Suborder: Polyphaga
- Infraorder: Cucujiformia
- Family: Cerambycidae
- Tribe: Pteropliini
- Genus: Mimabryna

Genus of beetles

Mimabryna is a genus of longhorn beetles of the subfamily Lamiinae, containing the following species:

- Mimabryna borneotica Breuning, 1966
- Mimabryna nicobarica Breuning, 1938
