= Pteroplius =

Scientific classification
- Kingdom: Animalia
- Phylum: Arthropoda
- Class: Insecta
- Order: Coleoptera
- Suborder: Polyphaga
- Infraorder: Cucujiformia
- Family: Cerambycidae
- Tribe: Pteropliini
- Genus: Pteroplius
- Species: P. acuminatus

Binomial name
- Pteroplius acuminatus Audinet-Serville, 1835

Genus of beetles

Pteroplius acuminatus is a species of beetle in the family Cerambycidae, and the only species in the genus Pteroplius. It was described by Audinet-Serville in 1835.
