= Menyllus maculicornis =

Scientific classification
- Kingdom: Animalia
- Phylum: Arthropoda
- Class: Insecta
- Order: Coleoptera
- Suborder: Polyphaga
- Infraorder: Cucujiformia
- Family: Cerambycidae
- Genus: Menyllus
- Species: M. maculicornis

Binomial name
- Menyllus maculicornis Pascoe, 1864

Synonyms
- Sysspilotus macleayi Pascoe, 1865

Species of beetle

Menyllus maculicornis is a species of beetle in the family Cerambycidae. It was described by Francis Polkinghorne Pascoe in 1864. It is known from Moluccas, Australia, and Papua New Guinea.
