= Mimabryna nicobarica =

Scientific classification
- Kingdom: Animalia
- Phylum: Arthropoda
- Class: Insecta
- Order: Coleoptera
- Suborder: Polyphaga
- Infraorder: Cucujiformia
- Family: Cerambycidae
- Genus: Mimabryna
- Species: M. nicobarica

Binomial name
- Mimabryna nicobarica Breuning, 1938

Species of beetle

Mimabryna nicobarica is a species of beetle in the family Cerambycidae. It was described by Stephan von Breuning in 1938. It is known from the Nicobar and Andaman Islands.
