= Pseudomiccolamia pulchra =

Scientific classification
- Kingdom: Animalia
- Phylum: Arthropoda
- Class: Insecta
- Order: Coleoptera
- Suborder: Polyphaga
- Infraorder: Cucujiformia
- Family: Cerambycidae
- Genus: Pseudomiccolamia
- Species: P. pulchra

Binomial name
- Pseudomiccolamia pulchra Pic, 1916

Species of beetle

Pseudomiccolamia pulchra is a species of beetle in the family Cerambycidae. It was described by Maurice Pic in 1916.
