= Macropraonetha =

Scientific classification
- Domain: Eukaryota
- Kingdom: Animalia
- Phylum: Arthropoda
- Class: Insecta
- Order: Coleoptera
- Suborder: Polyphaga
- Infraorder: Cucujiformia
- Family: Cerambycidae
- Tribe: Pteropliini
- Genus: Macropraonetha
- Species: M. pterolophioides

Binomial name
- Macropraonetha pterolophioides (Gressitt, 1942)

Genus of beetles

Macropraonetha is a genus of beetle in the family Cerambycidae. Its only species is Macropraonetha. It was described by Gressitt in 1942.
