= Exarrhenodes =

Scientific classification
- Kingdom: Animalia
- Phylum: Arthropoda
- Class: Insecta
- Order: Coleoptera
- Suborder: Polyphaga
- Infraorder: Cucujiformia
- Family: Cerambycidae
- Tribe: Pteropliini
- Genus: Exarrhenodes; Breuning, 1938
- Species: E. flavosticticus

Binomial name
- Exarrhenodes flavosticticus Breuning, 1938

Genus of beetles

Exarrhenodes is a genus of beetle in the family Cerambycidae. Its only species is Exarrhenodes flavosticticus. It was described by Stephan von Breuning in 1938.
