= Anobrium luridum =

Scientific classification
- Kingdom: Animalia
- Phylum: Arthropoda
- Class: Insecta
- Order: Coleoptera
- Suborder: Polyphaga
- Infraorder: Cucujiformia
- Family: Cerambycidae
- Genus: Anobrium
- Species: A. luridum

Binomial name
- Anobrium luridum (Breuning, 1940)

Synonyms
- Euteles lurida Breuning, 1940

Species of beetle

Anobrium luridum is a species of beetle in the family Cerambycidae. It was described by Stephan von Breuning in 1940. It is known from Brazil.
