= Gibbomesosella laosica =

Scientific classification
- Kingdom: Animalia
- Phylum: Arthropoda
- Class: Insecta
- Order: Coleoptera
- Suborder: Polyphaga
- Infraorder: Cucujiformia
- Family: Cerambycidae
- Genus: Gibbomesosella
- Species: G. laosica

Binomial name
- Gibbomesosella laosica Breuning, 1969

Species of beetle

Gibbomesosella laosica is a species of beetle in the family Cerambycidae. It was described by Stephan von Breuning in 1969. It is known from Laos.
