= Diexia =

Scientific classification
- Domain: Eukaryota
- Kingdom: Animalia
- Phylum: Arthropoda
- Class: Insecta
- Order: Coleoptera
- Suborder: Polyphaga
- Infraorder: Cucujiformia
- Family: Cerambycidae
- Tribe: Pteropliini
- Genus: Diexia
- Species: D. punctigera

Binomial name
- Diexia punctigera Pascoe, 1865

Genus of beetles

Diexia is a genus of beetle in the family Cerambycidae. Its only species is Diexia punctigera. It was described by Pascoe in 1865.
