= Phemonopsis =

Scientific classification
- Kingdom: Animalia
- Phylum: Arthropoda
- Class: Insecta
- Order: Coleoptera
- Suborder: Polyphaga
- Infraorder: Cucujiformia
- Family: Cerambycidae
- Tribe: Pteropliini
- Genus: Phemonopsis

Genus of beetles

Phemonopsis is a genus of longhorn beetles of the subfamily Lamiinae, containing the following species:

- Phemonopsis cylindricus Breuning, 1948
- Phemonopsis grossepunctatus Breuning, 1980
