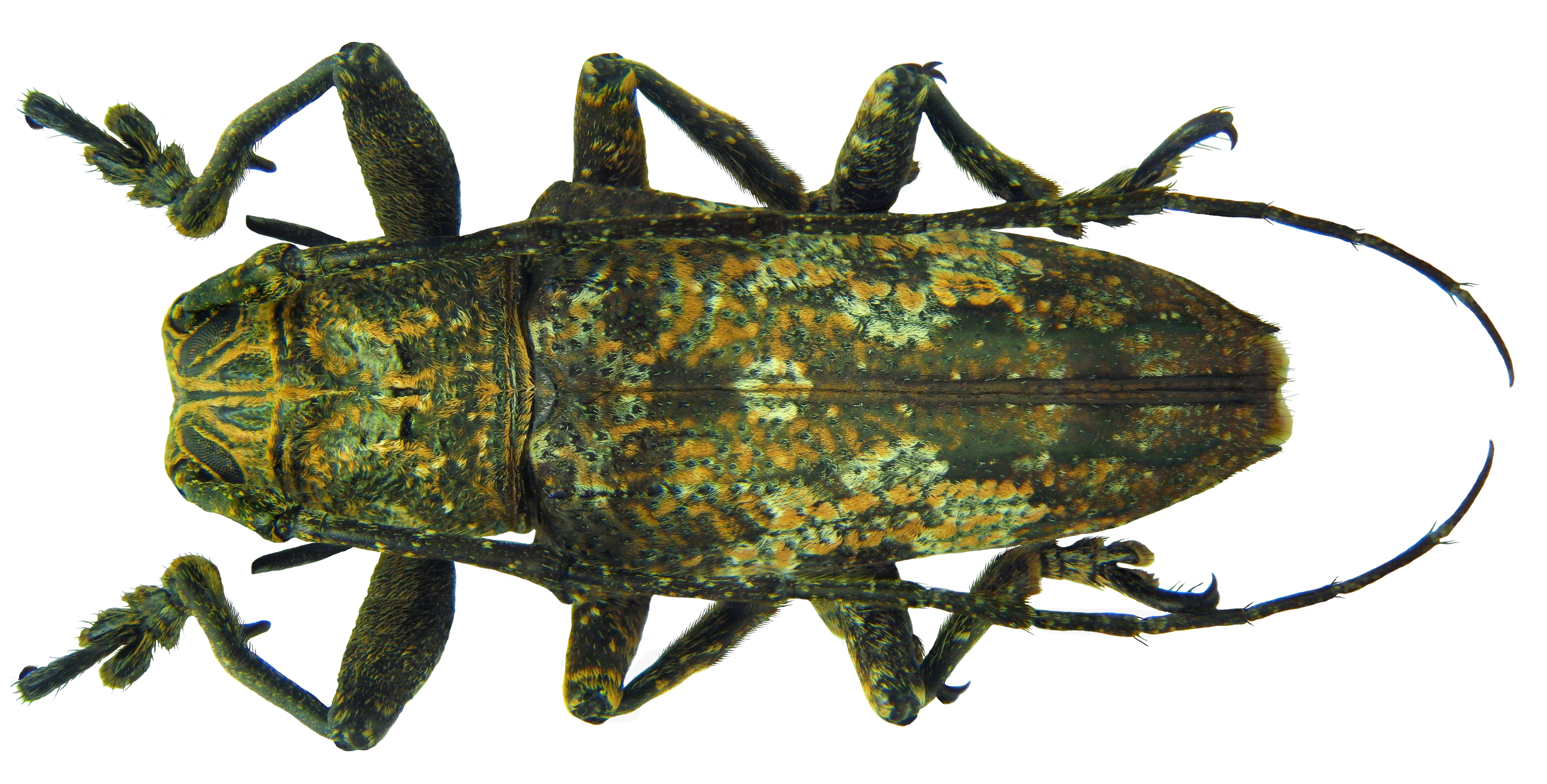
- Ischioplites metutus

Scientific classification
- Domain: Eukaryota
- Kingdom: Animalia
- Phylum: Arthropoda
- Class: Insecta
- Order: Coleoptera
- Suborder: Polyphaga
- Infraorder: Cucujiformia
- Family: Cerambycidae
- Tribe: Pteropliini
- Genus: Ischioplites

= Ischioplites =

Genus of beetles

Ischioplites is a genus of longhorn beetles of the subfamily Lamiinae, containing the following species:

- Ischioplites metutus (Pascoe, 1859)
- Ischioplites salomonum (Breuning, 1938)
