= Cyphoscyla =

Scientific classification
- Domain: Eukaryota
- Kingdom: Animalia
- Phylum: Arthropoda
- Class: Insecta
- Order: Coleoptera
- Suborder: Polyphaga
- Infraorder: Cucujiformia
- Family: Cerambycidae
- Tribe: Pteropliini
- Genus: Cyphoscyla
- Species: C. lacordairei

Binomial name
- Cyphoscyla lacordairei Thomson, 1868

Genus of beetles

Cyphoscyla is a genus of beetle in the family Cerambycidae. Its only species is Cyphoscyla lacordairei. It was described by Thomson in 1868.
