= Niphotragulus machadoi =

Scientific classification
- Kingdom: Animalia
- Phylum: Arthropoda
- Class: Insecta
- Order: Coleoptera
- Suborder: Polyphaga
- Infraorder: Cucujiformia
- Family: Cerambycidae
- Genus: Niphotragulus
- Species: N. machadoi

Binomial name
- Niphotragulus machadoi Breuning, 1970

Species of beetle

Niphotragulus machadoi is a species of beetle in the family Cerambycidae. It was described by Stephan von Breuning in 1970.
