= Phesatiodes =

Scientific classification
- Kingdom: Animalia
- Phylum: Arthropoda
- Class: Insecta
- Order: Coleoptera
- Suborder: Polyphaga
- Infraorder: Cucujiformia
- Family: Cerambycidae
- Subfamily: Lamiinae
- Tribe: Pteropliini
- Genus: Phesatiodes; Hüdepohl, 1995
- Species: P. fuscosignatus

Binomial name
- Phesatiodes fuscosignatus Hüdepohl, 1995

Genus of beetles

Phesatiodes fuscosignatus is a species of beetle in the family Cerambycidae, and the only species in the genus Phesatiodes. It was described by Hüdepohl in 1995.
