= Parabryna =

Scientific classification
- Domain: Eukaryota
- Kingdom: Animalia
- Phylum: Arthropoda
- Class: Insecta
- Order: Coleoptera
- Suborder: Polyphaga
- Infraorder: Cucujiformia
- Family: Cerambycidae
- Tribe: Pteropliini
- Genus: Parabryna
- Species: P. boudanti

Binomial name
- Parabryna boudanti Hüdepohl, 1995

Genus of beetles

Parabryna is a genus of beetle in the family Cerambycidae. Its sole species is Parabryna boudanti. It was described by Hüdepohl in 1995.
