= Sesiosa subfasciata =

Scientific classification
- Kingdom: Animalia
- Phylum: Arthropoda
- Class: Insecta
- Order: Coleoptera
- Suborder: Polyphaga
- Infraorder: Cucujiformia
- Family: Cerambycidae
- Genus: Sesiosa
- Species: S. subfasciata

Binomial name
- Sesiosa subfasciata Pascoe, 1865

Species of beetle

Sesiosa subfasciata is a species of beetle in the family Cerambycidae. It was described by Francis Polkinghorne Pascoe in 1865. It is known from Borneo, Singapore and Malaysia.
