= Pseudolophia =

Scientific classification
- Kingdom: Animalia
- Phylum: Arthropoda
- Class: Insecta
- Order: Coleoptera
- Suborder: Polyphaga
- Infraorder: Cucujiformia
- Family: Cerambycidae
- Genus: Pseudolophia
- Species: P. nigrosignata

Binomial name
- Pseudolophia nigrosignata Breuning, 1969

Genus of beetles

Pseudolophia nigrosignata is a species of beetle in the family Cerambycidae, and the only species in the genus Pseudolophia. It was described by Stephan von Breuning in 1969.
