= Mindanaona =

Scientific classification
- Kingdom: Animalia
- Phylum: Arthropoda
- Class: Insecta
- Order: Coleoptera
- Suborder: Polyphaga
- Infraorder: Cucujiformia
- Family: Cerambycidae
- Genus: Mindanaona
- Species: M. mindanaonis

Binomial name
- Mindanaona mindanaonis (Breuning, 1958)

Genus of beetles

Mindanaona mindanaonis is a species of beetle in the family Cerambycidae, and the only species in the genus Mindanaona. It was described by Stephan von Breuning in 1958.
