= Lychrosimorphus =

Scientific classification
- Kingdom: Animalia
- Phylum: Arthropoda
- Clade: Pancrustacea
- Class: Insecta
- Order: Coleoptera
- Suborder: Polyphaga
- Infraorder: Cucujiformia
- Family: Cerambycidae
- Genus: Lychrosimorphus
- Species: L. vittatus

Binomial name
- Lychrosimorphus vittatus Pic, 1925

Genus of beetles

Lychrosimorphus is a genus of beetle in the family Cerambycidae. Its only species is Lychrosimorphus vittatus. It was described by Maurice Pic in 1925.
