= Depsages =

Scientific classification
- Kingdom: Animalia
- Phylum: Arthropoda
- Clade: Pancrustacea
- Class: Insecta
- Order: Coleoptera
- Suborder: Polyphaga
- Infraorder: Cucujiformia
- Family: Cerambycidae
- Genus: Depsages
- Species: D. granulosa

Binomial name
- Depsages granulosa (Guérin-Méneville, 1831)

Genus of beetles

Depsages is a genus of beetle in the family Cerambycidae. Its only species is Depsages granulosa. It was described by Félix Édouard Guérin-Méneville in 1831.
