= Sybropraonetha =

Scientific classification
- Kingdom: Animalia
- Phylum: Arthropoda
- Class: Insecta
- Order: Coleoptera
- Suborder: Polyphaga
- Infraorder: Cucujiformia
- Family: Cerambycidae
- Genus: Sybropraonetha
- Species: S. minuta

Binomial name
- Sybropraonetha minuta Breuning, 1960

Genus of beetles

Sybropraonetha minuta is a species of beetle in the family Cerambycidae, and the only species in the genus Sybropraonetha. It was described by Stephan von Breuning in 1960.
