= Pseudalidus =

Scientific classification
- Kingdom: Animalia
- Phylum: Arthropoda
- Class: Insecta
- Order: Coleoptera
- Suborder: Polyphaga
- Infraorder: Cucujiformia
- Family: Cerambycidae
- Genus: Pseudalidus
- Species: P. fulvofasciculatus

Binomial name
- Pseudalidus fulvofasciculatus (Pic, 1926)

Genus of beetles

Pseudalidus fulvofasciculatus is a species of beetle in the family Cerambycidae, and the only species in the genus Pseudalidus. It was described by Pic in 1926.
