= Cicatripraonetha =

Scientific classification
- Kingdom: Animalia
- Phylum: Arthropoda
- Class: Insecta
- Order: Coleoptera
- Suborder: Polyphaga
- Infraorder: Cucujiformia
- Family: Cerambycidae
- Genus: Cicatripraonetha
- Species: C. lumawigi

Binomial name
- Cicatripraonetha lumawigi Breuning, 1980 inq.

Genus of beetles

Cicatripraonetha is a genus of beetle in the family Cerambycidae. Its only species is Cicatripraonetha lumawigi. It was described by Stephan von Breuning in 1980.
