= Tuberculetaxalus =

Scientific classification
- Kingdom: Animalia
- Phylum: Arthropoda
- Class: Insecta
- Order: Coleoptera
- Suborder: Polyphaga
- Infraorder: Cucujiformia
- Family: Cerambycidae
- Genus: Tuberculetaxalus
- Species: T. lumawigi

Binomial name
- Tuberculetaxalus lumawigi Breuning, 1980

Genus of beetles

Tuberculetaxalus lumawigi is a species of beetle in the family Cerambycidae, and the only species in the genus Tuberculetaxalus. It was described by Stephan von Breuning in 1980.
