= Paradiexia =

Scientific classification
- Kingdom: Animalia
- Phylum: Arthropoda
- Class: Insecta
- Order: Coleoptera
- Suborder: Polyphaga
- Infraorder: Cucujiformia
- Family: Cerambycidae
- Genus: Paradiexia
- Species: P. pellita

Binomial name
- Paradiexia pellita Heller, 1923

Genus of beetles

Paradiexia pellita is a species of beetle in the family Cerambycidae, and the only species in the genus Paradiexia. It was described by Heller in 1923.
