= Hathliolophia =

Scientific classification
- Kingdom: Animalia
- Phylum: Arthropoda
- Clade: Pancrustacea
- Class: Insecta
- Order: Coleoptera
- Suborder: Polyphaga
- Infraorder: Cucujiformia
- Family: Cerambycidae
- Genus: Hathliolophia
- Species: H. alboplagiata

Binomial name
- Hathliolophia alboplagiata Breuning, 1959

Genus of beetles

Hathliolophia is a genus of beetle in the family Cerambycidae. Its only species is Hathliolophia alboplagiata. It was described by Stephan von Breuning in 1959.
