= Demodioides =

Scientific classification
- Kingdom: Animalia
- Phylum: Arthropoda
- Clade: Pancrustacea
- Class: Insecta
- Order: Coleoptera
- Suborder: Polyphaga
- Infraorder: Cucujiformia
- Family: Cerambycidae
- Genus: Demodioides
- Species: D. transversevittata

Binomial name
- Demodioides transversevittata Breuning, 1947

Genus of beetles

Demodioides is a genus of beetle in the family Cerambycidae. Its only species is Demodioides transversevittata. It was described by Stephan von Breuning in 1947.
