= Mimoprosoplus =

Scientific classification
- Kingdom: Animalia
- Phylum: Arthropoda
- Class: Insecta
- Order: Coleoptera
- Suborder: Polyphaga
- Infraorder: Cucujiformia
- Family: Cerambycidae
- Genus: Mimoprosoplus
- Species: M. convexus

Binomial name
- Mimoprosoplus convexus Breuning, 1970

Genus of beetles

Mimoprosoplus convexus is a species of beetle in the family Cerambycidae, and the only species in the genus Mimoprosoplus. It was described by Stephan von Breuning in 1970.
