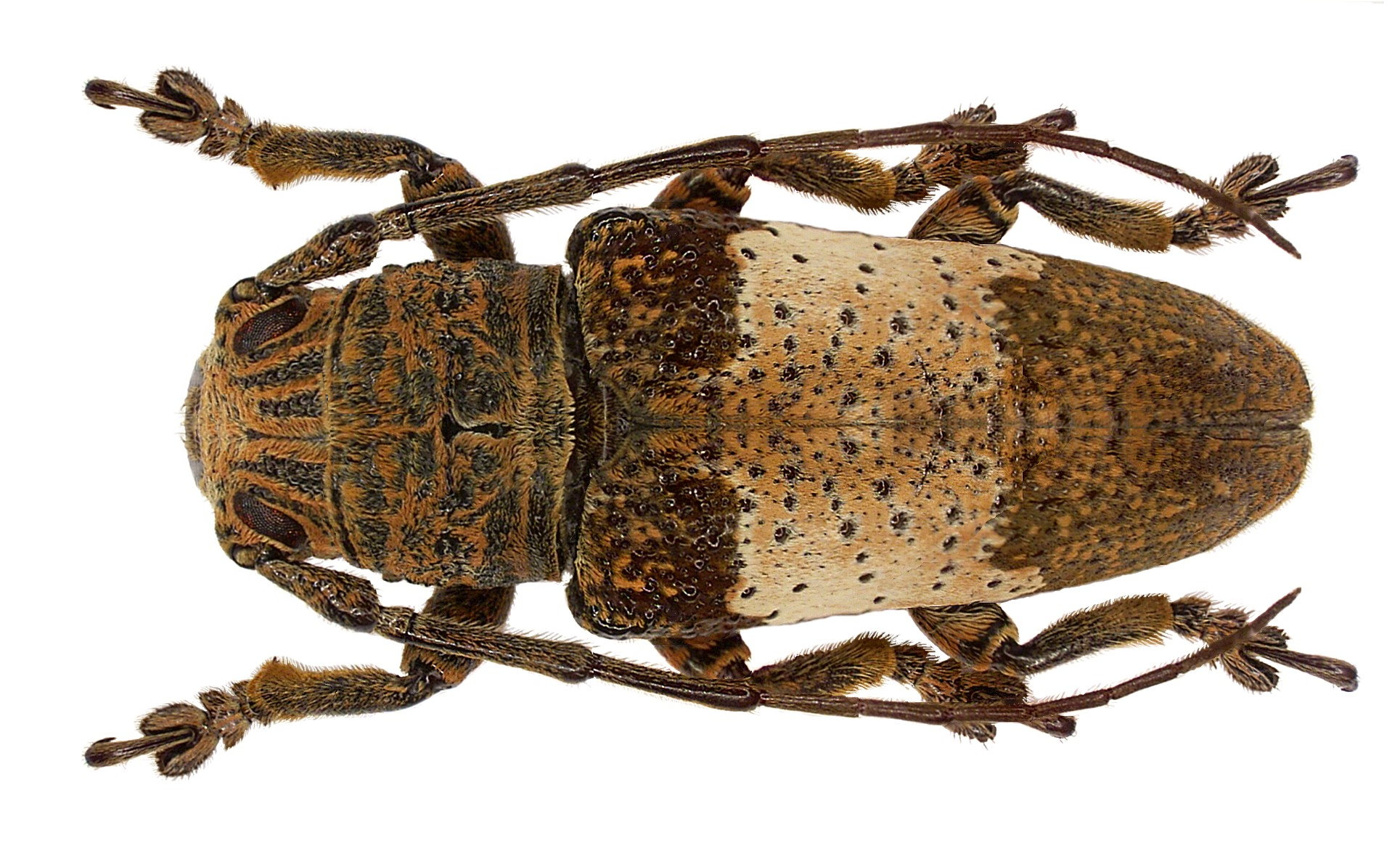

Scientific classification
- Kingdom: Animalia
- Phylum: Arthropoda
- Class: Insecta
- Order: Coleoptera
- Suborder: Polyphaga
- Infraorder: Cucujiformia
- Family: Cerambycidae
- Genus: Platycranium
- Species: P. pustulosum

Binomial name
- Platycranium pustulosum (Pascoe, 1864)

= Platycranium =

Genus of beetles

Platycranium pustulosum is a species of beetle in the family Cerambycidae, and the only species in the genus Platycranium. It was described by Pascoe in 1864.
