= Thaumasesthes =

Scientific classification
- Kingdom: Animalia
- Phylum: Arthropoda
- Class: Insecta
- Order: Coleoptera
- Suborder: Polyphaga
- Infraorder: Cucujiformia
- Family: Cerambycidae
- Genus: Thaumasesthes
- Species: T. penicillus

Binomial name
- Thaumasesthes penicillus Fairmaire, 1894

Genus of beetles

Thaumasesthes penicillus is a species of beetle in the family Cerambycidae, and the only species in the genus Thaumasesthes. It was described by Fairmaire in 1894.
