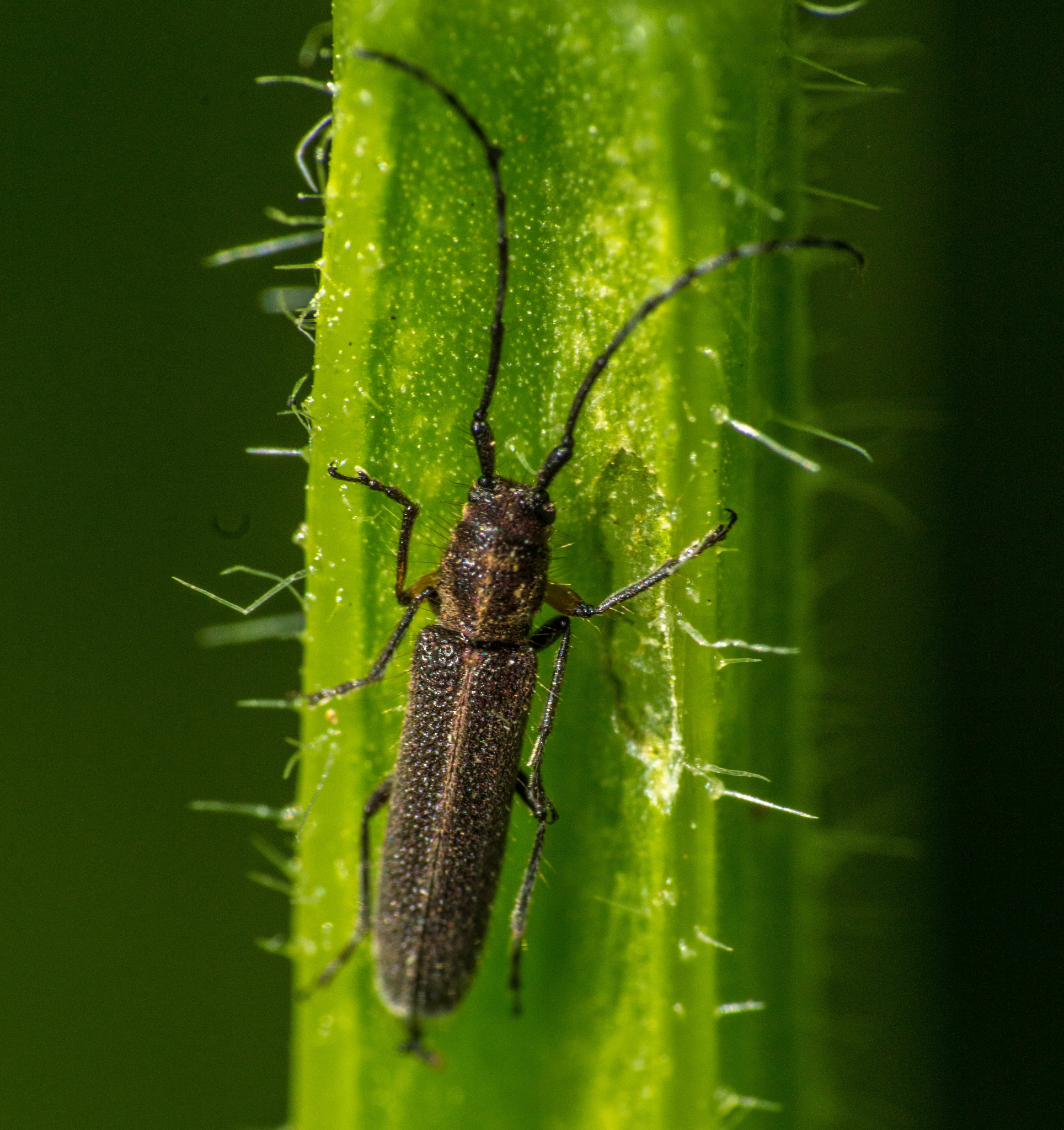

Scientific classification
- Kingdom: Animalia
- Phylum: Arthropoda
- Clade: Pancrustacea
- Class: Insecta
- Order: Coleoptera
- Suborder: Polyphaga
- Infraorder: Cucujiformia
- Family: Cerambycidae
- Genus: Emphytoeciosoma
- Species: E. daguerrei

Binomial name
- Emphytoeciosoma daguerrei Melzer, 1934

= Emphytoeciosoma =

Emphytoeciosoma daguerrei

Genus of beetles

Emphytoeciosoma is a genus of beetles in the family Cerambycidae. It is monotypic, being represented by the single species Emphytoeciosoma daguerrei. It was first described by Julius Melzer in 1934.
