= Paratybe =

Scientific classification
- Kingdom: Animalia
- Phylum: Arthropoda
- Class: Insecta
- Order: Coleoptera
- Suborder: Polyphaga
- Infraorder: Cucujiformia
- Family: Cerambycidae
- Genus: Paratybe
- Species: P. snizeki

Binomial name
- Paratybe snizeki Téocchi & Sudre, 2003

Genus of beetles

Paratybe snizeki is a species of beetle in the family Cerambycidae, and the only species in the genus Paratybe. It was described by Téocchi and Sudre in 2003.
