= Paracorrhenes =

Scientific classification
- Kingdom: Animalia
- Phylum: Arthropoda
- Class: Insecta
- Order: Coleoptera
- Suborder: Polyphaga
- Infraorder: Cucujiformia
- Family: Cerambycidae
- Genus: Paracorrhenes
- Species: P. flavomaculata

Binomial name
- Paracorrhenes flavomaculata Breuning, 1978

Genus of beetles

Paracorrhenes is a genus of beetle in the family Cerambycidae. Its sole species is Paracorrhenes flavomaculata. It was described by Stephan von Breuning in 1978.
