= Niphonatossa =

Scientific classification
- Kingdom: Animalia
- Phylum: Arthropoda
- Class: Insecta
- Order: Coleoptera
- Suborder: Polyphaga
- Infraorder: Cucujiformia
- Family: Cerambycidae
- Genus: Niphonatossa
- Species: N. mussardi

Binomial name
- Niphonatossa mussardi Breuning, 1967

Genus of beetles

Niphonatossa mussardi is a species of beetle in the family Cerambycidae, and the only species in the genus Niphonatossa. It was described by Stephan von Breuning in 1967.
