= Niphopterolophia =

Scientific classification
- Kingdom: Animalia
- Phylum: Arthropoda
- Class: Insecta
- Order: Coleoptera
- Suborder: Polyphaga
- Infraorder: Cucujiformia
- Family: Cerambycidae
- Genus: Niphopterolophia
- Species: N. geminata

Binomial name
- Niphopterolophia geminata Breuning, 1964

Genus of beetles

Niphopterolophia geminata is a species of beetle in the family Cerambycidae, and the only species in the genus Niphopterolophia. It was described by Stephan von Breuning in 1964.
