= Pseudomussardia =

Scientific classification
- Kingdom: Animalia
- Phylum: Arthropoda
- Class: Insecta
- Order: Coleoptera
- Suborder: Polyphaga
- Infraorder: Cucujiformia
- Family: Cerambycidae
- Genus: Pseudomussardia
- Species: P. congoensis

Binomial name
- Pseudomussardia congoensis Breuning, 1974

Species of beetle

Pseudomussardia congoensis is a species of beetle in the family Cerambycidae, and the only species in the genus Pseudomussardia. It was described by Stephan von Breuning in 1974.
