= Pentheopraonetha =

Scientific classification
- Kingdom: Animalia
- Phylum: Arthropoda
- Class: Insecta
- Order: Coleoptera
- Suborder: Polyphaga
- Infraorder: Cucujiformia
- Family: Cerambycidae
- Genus: Pentheopraonetha
- Species: P. latifrons

Binomial name
- Pentheopraonetha latifrons Breuning, 1960

Genus of beetles

Pentheopraonetha latifrons is a species of beetle in the family Cerambycidae, and the only species in the genus Pentheopraonetha. It was described by Stephan von Breuning in 1960.
