= Soridopsis =

Scientific classification
- Kingdom: Animalia
- Phylum: Arthropoda
- Class: Insecta
- Order: Coleoptera
- Suborder: Polyphaga
- Infraorder: Cucujiformia
- Family: Cerambycidae
- Genus: Soridopsis
- Species: S. biapicata

Binomial name
- Soridopsis biapicata Breuning, 1940

Genus of beetles

Soridopsis biapicata is a species of beetle in the family Cerambycidae, and the only species in the genus Soridopsis. It was described by Stephan von Breuning in 1940.
