= Trichoprosoplus =

Scientific classification
- Kingdom: Animalia
- Phylum: Arthropoda
- Class: Insecta
- Order: Coleoptera
- Suborder: Polyphaga
- Infraorder: Cucujiformia
- Family: Cerambycidae
- Genus: Trichoprosoplus
- Species: T. demarzi

Binomial name
- Trichoprosoplus demarzi Breuning, 1961

Genus of beetles

Trichoprosoplus demarzi is a species of beetle in the family Cerambycidae, and the only species in the genus Trichoprosoplus. It was described by Stephan von Breuning in 1961.
