= Nipholophia =

Scientific classification
- Kingdom: Animalia
- Phylum: Arthropoda
- Class: Insecta
- Order: Coleoptera
- Suborder: Polyphaga
- Infraorder: Cucujiformia
- Family: Cerambycidae
- Genus: Nipholophia
- Species: N. chujoi

Binomial name
- Nipholophia chujoi Gressitt, 1951

Genus of beetles

Nipholophia chujoi is a species of beetle in the family Cerambycidae, and the only species in the genus Nipholophia. It was described by Gressitt in 1951.
