= Acanthetaxalus =

Scientific classification
- Kingdom: Animalia
- Phylum: Arthropoda
- Clade: Pancrustacea
- Class: Insecta
- Order: Coleoptera
- Suborder: Polyphaga
- Infraorder: Cucujiformia
- Family: Cerambycidae
- Genus: Acanthetaxalus
- Species: A. bostrychoides

Binomial name
- Acanthetaxalus bostrychoides Breuning, 1961

Genus of beetles

Acanthetaxalus is a genus of the beetle in the family Cerambycidae. Its only species is Acanthetaxalus bostrychoides. It was described by Stephan von Breuning in 1961.
