= Sybropis =

Scientific classification
- Kingdom: Animalia
- Phylum: Arthropoda
- Class: Insecta
- Order: Coleoptera
- Suborder: Polyphaga
- Infraorder: Cucujiformia
- Family: Cerambycidae
- Genus: Sybropis
- Species: S. frontalis

Binomial name
- Sybropis frontalis Pascoe, 1885

Genus of beetles

Sybropis frontalis is a species of beetle in the family Cerambycidae, and the only species in the genus Sybropis. It was described by Pascoe in 1885.
