= Falsozorilispe =

Scientific classification
- Kingdom: Animalia
- Phylum: Arthropoda
- Clade: Pancrustacea
- Class: Insecta
- Order: Coleoptera
- Suborder: Polyphaga
- Infraorder: Cucujiformia
- Family: Cerambycidae
- Genus: Falsozorilispe
- Species: F. linearis

Binomial name
- Falsozorilispe linearis Breuning, 1943

Genus of beetles

Falsozorilispe is a genus of beetle in the family Cerambycidae. Its only species is Falsozorilispe linearis. It was described by Stephan von Breuning in 1943.
