= Albapomecyna =

Scientific classification
- Kingdom: Animalia
- Phylum: Arthropoda
- Clade: Pancrustacea
- Class: Insecta
- Order: Coleoptera
- Suborder: Polyphaga
- Infraorder: Cucujiformia
- Family: Cerambycidae
- Genus: Albapomecyna
- Species: A. alboplagiata

Binomial name
- Albapomecyna alboplagiata Breuning, 1980

Genus of beetles

Albapomecyna is a genus of beetle in the family Cerambycidae. Its sole species is Albapomecyna alboplagiata. It was described by Stephan von Breuning in 1980.
