= Piliranova =

Scientific classification
- Kingdom: Animalia
- Phylum: Arthropoda
- Class: Insecta
- Order: Coleoptera
- Suborder: Polyphaga
- Infraorder: Cucujiformia
- Family: Cerambycidae
- Genus: Piliranova
- Species: P. pilipes

Binomial name
- Piliranova pilipes Breuning, 1960

Genus of beetles

Piliranova pilipes is a species of beetle in the family Cerambycidae, and the only species in the genus Piliranova. It was described by Stephan von Breuning in 1960.
