= Mimectatosia =

Scientific classification
- Kingdom: Animalia
- Phylum: Arthropoda
- Clade: Pancrustacea
- Class: Insecta
- Order: Coleoptera
- Suborder: Polyphaga
- Infraorder: Cucujiformia
- Family: Cerambycidae
- Genus: Mimectatosia
- Species: M. compacta

Binomial name
- Mimectatosia compacta Breuning, 1959

Genus of beetles

Mimectatosia is a genus of beetle in the family Cerambycidae. Its only species is Mimectatosia compacta. It was described by Stephan von Breuning in 1959.
