= Squamosaperdopsis =

Scientific classification
- Kingdom: Animalia
- Phylum: Arthropoda
- Class: Insecta
- Order: Coleoptera
- Suborder: Polyphaga
- Infraorder: Cucujiformia
- Family: Cerambycidae
- Genus: Squamosaperdopsis
- Species: S. squamosa

Binomial name
- Squamosaperdopsis squamosa (Pascoe, 1864)

Genus of beetles

Squamosaperdopsis squamosa is a species of beetle in the family Cerambycidae, and the only species in the genus Squamosaperdopsis. It was described by Pascoe in 1864.
