= Mimoniphona =

Scientific classification
- Kingdom: Animalia
- Phylum: Arthropoda
- Class: Insecta
- Order: Coleoptera
- Suborder: Polyphaga
- Infraorder: Cucujiformia
- Family: Cerambycidae
- Genus: Mimoniphona
- Species: M. fasciculata

Binomial name
- Mimoniphona fasciculata Breuning, 1940

Genus of beetles

Mimoniphona fasciculata is a species of beetle in the family Cerambycidae, and the only species in the genus Mimoniphona. It was described by Stephan von Breuning in 1940.
