= Zosmotes =

Scientific classification
- Kingdom: Animalia
- Phylum: Arthropoda
- Class: Insecta
- Order: Coleoptera
- Suborder: Polyphaga
- Infraorder: Cucujiformia
- Family: Cerambycidae
- Genus: Zosmotes
- Species: Z. plumula

Binomial name
- Zosmotes plumula Pascoe, 1865

Genus of beetles

Zosmotes plumula is a species of beetle in the family Cerambycidae, and the only species in the genus Zosmotes. It was described by Pascoe in 1865.
