= Paramispilopsis =

Scientific classification
- Kingdom: Animalia
- Phylum: Arthropoda
- Class: Insecta
- Order: Coleoptera
- Suborder: Polyphaga
- Infraorder: Cucujiformia
- Family: Cerambycidae
- Genus: Paramispilopsis
- Species: P. indica

Binomial name
- Paramispilopsis indica Breuning, 1947

Genus of beetles

Paramispilopsis indica is a species of beetle in the family Cerambycidae, and the only species in the genus Paramispilopsis. It was described by Stephan von Breuning in 1947.
