= Tricholophia =

Scientific classification
- Kingdom: Animalia
- Phylum: Arthropoda
- Class: Insecta
- Order: Coleoptera
- Suborder: Polyphaga
- Infraorder: Cucujiformia
- Family: Cerambycidae
- Genus: Tricholophia
- Species: T. ceylonica

Binomial name
- Tricholophia ceylonica Breuning, 1938

Genus of beetles

Tricholophia ceylonica is a species of beetle in the family Cerambycidae, and the only species in the genus Tricholophia. It was described by Stephan von Breuning in 1938.
