= Niphovelleda =

Scientific classification
- Kingdom: Animalia
- Phylum: Arthropoda
- Class: Insecta
- Order: Coleoptera
- Suborder: Polyphaga
- Infraorder: Cucujiformia
- Family: Cerambycidae
- Genus: Niphovelleda
- Species: N. gracilis

Binomial name
- Niphovelleda gracilis Breuning, 1940

Genus of beetles

Niphovelleda gracilis is a species of beetle in the family Cerambycidae, and the only species in the genus Niphovelleda. It was described by Stephan von Breuning in 1940.
