= Rhaphipteroides =

Scientific classification
- Kingdom: Animalia
- Phylum: Arthropoda
- Class: Insecta
- Order: Coleoptera
- Suborder: Polyphaga
- Infraorder: Cucujiformia
- Family: Cerambycidae
- Genus: Rhaphipteroides
- Species: R. apicalis

Binomial name
- Rhaphipteroides apicalis Touroult & Tavakilian, 2007

Genus of beetles

Rhaphipteroides apicalis is a species of beetle in the family Cerambycidae, and the only species in the genus Rhaphipteroides. It was described by Touroult and Tavakilian in 2007.
