= Pseudomoron =

Scientific classification
- Kingdom: Animalia
- Phylum: Arthropoda
- Class: Insecta
- Order: Coleoptera
- Suborder: Polyphaga
- Infraorder: Cucujiformia
- Family: Cerambycidae
- Genus: Pseudomoron
- Species: P. hiekei

Binomial name
- Pseudomoron hiekei Breuning, 1965

Genus of beetles

Pseudomoron hiekei is a species of beetle in the family Cerambycidae, and the only species in the genus Pseudomoron. It was described by Stephan von Breuning in 1965.
