= Mussardia =

Scientific classification
- Kingdom: Animalia
- Phylum: Arthropoda
- Class: Insecta
- Order: Coleoptera
- Suborder: Polyphaga
- Infraorder: Cucujiformia
- Family: Cerambycidae
- Genus: Mussardia
- Species: M. griseoplagiata

Binomial name
- Mussardia griseoplagiata Breuning, 1959

Genus of beetles

Mussardia griseoplagiata is a species of beetle in the family Cerambycidae, and the only species in the genus Mussardia. It was described by Stephan von Breuning in 1959.
