= Falsoprosoplus =

Scientific classification
- Kingdom: Animalia
- Phylum: Arthropoda
- Class: Insecta
- Order: Coleoptera
- Suborder: Polyphaga
- Infraorder: Cucujiformia
- Family: Cerambycidae
- Genus: Falsoprosoplus
- Species: F. luzonicus

Binomial name
- Falsoprosoplus luzonicus Breuning, 1974

Genus of beetles

Falsoprosoplus luzonicus is a species of beetle in the family Cerambycidae, and the only species in the genus Falsoprosoplus. It was described by Stephan von Breuning in 1974.
