= Pseudoparmena =

Scientific classification
- Kingdom: Animalia
- Phylum: Arthropoda
- Class: Insecta
- Order: Coleoptera
- Suborder: Polyphaga
- Infraorder: Cucujiformia
- Family: Cerambycidae
- Genus: Pseudoparmena
- Species: P. borchmanni

Binomial name
- Pseudoparmena borchmanni Breuning, 1956

Genus of beetles

Pseudoparmena borchmanni is a species of beetle in the family Cerambycidae, and the only species in the genus Pseudoparmena. It was described by Stephan von Breuning in 1956.
