= Cubilioides =

Scientific classification
- Kingdom: Animalia
- Phylum: Arthropoda
- Clade: Pancrustacea
- Class: Insecta
- Order: Coleoptera
- Suborder: Polyphaga
- Infraorder: Cucujiformia
- Family: Cerambycidae
- Genus: Cubilioides
- Species: C. singularis

Binomial name
- Cubilioides singularis Breuning, 1940

Genus of beetles

Cubilioides is a genus of beetle in the family Cerambycidae, Its sole species is Cubilioides singularis. It was described by Stephan von Breuning in 1940.
