= Eosthenias =

Scientific classification
- Kingdom: Animalia
- Phylum: Arthropoda
- Clade: Pancrustacea
- Class: Insecta
- Order: Coleoptera
- Suborder: Polyphaga
- Infraorder: Cucujiformia
- Family: Cerambycidae
- Genus: Eosthenias
- Species: E. fasciculosus

Binomial name
- Eosthenias fasciculosus (Breuning, 1938)

Genus of beetles

Eosthenias is a genus of beetle in the family Cerambycidae. Its only species is Eosthenias fasciculosus. It was described by Stephan von Breuning in 1938.
