= Corrhenispia =

Scientific classification
- Kingdom: Animalia
- Phylum: Arthropoda
- Class: Insecta
- Order: Coleoptera
- Suborder: Polyphaga
- Infraorder: Cucujiformia
- Family: Cerambycidae
- Genus: Corrhenispia
- Species: C. cylindrica

Binomial name
- Corrhenispia cylindrica Breuning, 1938

Genus of beetles

Corrhenispia is a genus of beetle in the family Cerambycidae. Its only species is Corrhenispia cylindrica. It was described by Stephan von Breuning in 1938.
