= Sodopsis =

Scientific classification
- Kingdom: Animalia
- Phylum: Arthropoda
- Class: Insecta
- Order: Coleoptera
- Suborder: Polyphaga
- Infraorder: Cucujiformia
- Family: Cerambycidae
- Genus: Sodopsis
- Species: S. curvifascia

Binomial name
- Sodopsis curvifascia Breuning, 1961

Genus of beetles

Sodopsis curvifascia is a species of beetle in the family Cerambycidae, and the only species in the genus Sodopsis. It was described by Stephan von Breuning in 1961.
