= Niphosoma =

Scientific classification
- Domain: Eukaryota
- Kingdom: Animalia
- Phylum: Arthropoda
- Class: Insecta
- Order: Coleoptera
- Suborder: Polyphaga
- Infraorder: Cucujiformia
- Family: Cerambycidae
- Genus: Niphosoma

Genus of beetles

Niphosoma is a genus of longhorn beetles of the subfamily Lamiinae, containing the following species:

- Niphosoma compacta Breuning, 1943
- Niphosoma sikkimensis Breuning, 1957
