= Paramussardiana =

Scientific classification
- Kingdom: Animalia
- Phylum: Arthropoda
- Class: Insecta
- Order: Coleoptera
- Suborder: Polyphaga
- Infraorder: Cucujiformia
- Family: Cerambycidae
- Genus: Paramussardiana
- Species: P. quadricostata

Binomial name
- Paramussardiana quadricostata (Breuning, 1978)

Genus of beetles

Paramussardiana is a genus of beetle in the family Cerambycidae. Its sole species is Paramussardiana quadricostata. It was described by Stephan von Breuning in 1978.
