= Mimatossa =

Scientific classification
- Kingdom: Animalia
- Phylum: Arthropoda
- Clade: Pancrustacea
- Class: Insecta
- Order: Coleoptera
- Suborder: Polyphaga
- Infraorder: Cucujiformia
- Family: Cerambycidae
- Genus: Mimatossa
- Species: M. flavolineata

Binomial name
- Mimatossa flavolineata Breuning, 1943

Genus of beetles

Mimatossa is a genus of beetle in the family Cerambycidae. Its only species is Mimatossa flavolineata. It was described by Stephan von Breuning in 1943.
