= Brachyale =

Scientific classification
- Kingdom: Animalia
- Phylum: Arthropoda
- Clade: Pancrustacea
- Class: Insecta
- Order: Coleoptera
- Suborder: Polyphaga
- Infraorder: Cucujiformia
- Family: Cerambycidae
- Genus: Brachyale
- Species: B. pterolophioides

Binomial name
- Brachyale pterolophioides Breuning, 1963

Genus of beetles

Brachyale is a genus of beetle in the family Cerambycidae. Its sole species is Brachyale pterolophioides. It was described by Stephan von Breuning in 1963.
