= Paramispila =

Scientific classification
- Kingdom: Animalia
- Phylum: Arthropoda
- Clade: Pancrustacea
- Class: Insecta
- Order: Coleoptera
- Suborder: Polyphaga
- Infraorder: Cucujiformia
- Family: Cerambycidae
- Genus: Paramispila
- Species: P. bispecularis

Binomial name
- Paramispila bispecularis (White, 1858)

Genus of beetles

Paramispila bispecularis is a monotypic genus of beetle in the family Cerambycidae. Its sole species is Paramispila bispecularis. It was described by White in 1858.
