= Mimaspurgus =

Scientific classification
- Kingdom: Animalia
- Phylum: Arthropoda
- Class: Insecta
- Order: Coleoptera
- Suborder: Polyphaga
- Infraorder: Cucujiformia
- Family: Cerambycidae
- Genus: Mimaspurgus
- Species: M. niveoscutellatus

Binomial name
- Mimaspurgus niveoscutellatus (Breuning, 1939)

Genus of beetles

Mimaspurgus is a genus of beetle in the family Cerambycidae. Its only species is Mimaspurgus niveoscutellatus. It was described by Stephan von Breuning in 1939.
