= Rhytiphora cowleyi =

Scientific classification
- Kingdom: Animalia
- Phylum: Arthropoda
- Clade: Pancrustacea
- Class: Insecta
- Order: Coleoptera
- Suborder: Polyphaga
- Infraorder: Cucujiformia
- Family: Cerambycidae
- Genus: Rhytiphora
- Species: R. cowleyi

Binomial name
- Rhytiphora cowleyi (Blackburn, 1895)

Genus of beetles

Rhytiphora cowleyi is a species of beetle in the family Cerambycidae. It was originally described by Blackburn in 1895 as Cairnsia cowleyi.
