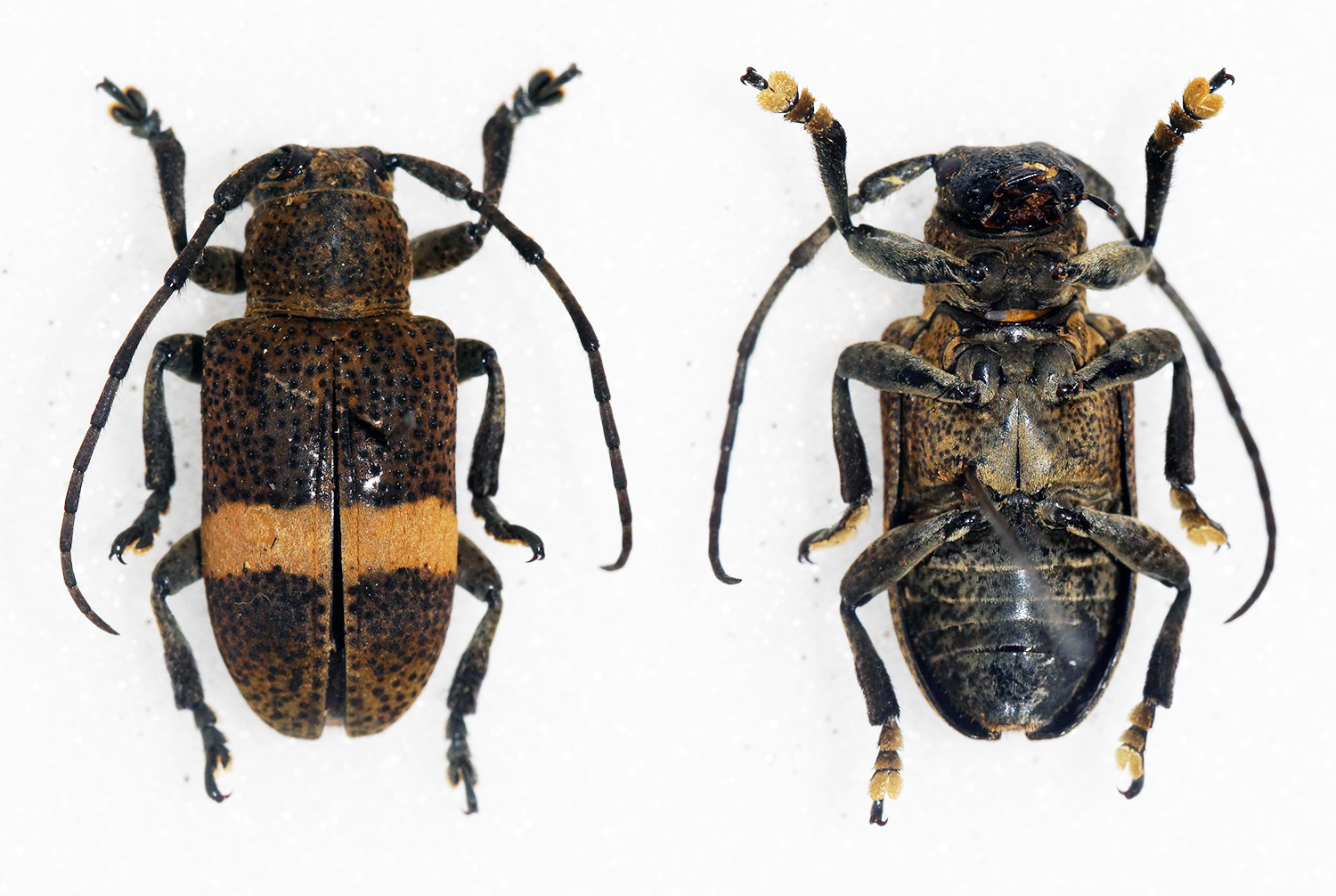

Scientific classification
- Kingdom: Animalia
- Phylum: Arthropoda
- Clade: Pancrustacea
- Class: Insecta
- Order: Coleoptera
- Suborder: Polyphaga
- Infraorder: Cucujiformia
- Family: Cerambycidae
- Genus: Alidopsis
- Species: A. latefasciatus

Binomial name
- Alidopsis latefasciatus (Breuning, 1938)

= Alidopsis =

Genus of beetles

Alidopsis is a genus of beetle in the family Cerambycidae. Its only species is Alidopsis latefasciatus. It was described by Stephan von Breuning in 1938.
