= Trichovelleda =

Scientific classification
- Kingdom: Animalia
- Phylum: Arthropoda
- Class: Insecta
- Order: Coleoptera
- Suborder: Polyphaga
- Infraorder: Cucujiformia
- Family: Cerambycidae
- Genus: Trichovelleda
- Species: T. rufula

Binomial name
- Trichovelleda rufula Breuning, 1970

Genus of beetles

Trichovelleda rufula is a species of beetle in the family Cerambycidae, and the only species in the genus Trichovelleda. It was described by Stephan von Breuning in 1970.
