= Spinetaxalus =

Scientific classification
- Kingdom: Animalia
- Phylum: Arthropoda
- Class: Insecta
- Order: Coleoptera
- Suborder: Polyphaga
- Infraorder: Cucujiformia
- Family: Cerambycidae
- Genus: Spinetaxalus
- Species: S. camerunensis

Binomial name
- Spinetaxalus camerunensis Breuning, 1981

Genus of beetles

Spinetaxalus camerunensis is a species of beetle in the family Cerambycidae, and the only species in the genus Spinetaxalus. It was described by Stephan von Breuning in 1981.
