= Stephanomenyllus =

Scientific classification
- Kingdom: Animalia
- Phylum: Arthropoda
- Class: Insecta
- Order: Coleoptera
- Suborder: Polyphaga
- Infraorder: Cucujiformia
- Family: Cerambycidae
- Subfamily: Lamiinae
- Tribe: Pteropliini
- Genus: Stephanomenyllus; Tavakilian & Jiroux, 2015
- Species: S. quadricostulatus

Binomial name
- Stephanomenyllus quadricostulatus (Breuning, 1980)

Synonyms
- Mimomenyllus quadricostulatus Breuning, 1980

Species of beetle

Stephanomenyllus quadricostulatus is a species of beetle in the family Cerambycidae. It is the only species in the genus Stephanomenyllus. The species was described by Stephan von Breuning in 1980.
