= Parepectasoides =

Scientific classification
- Kingdom: Animalia
- Phylum: Arthropoda
- Class: Insecta
- Order: Coleoptera
- Suborder: Polyphaga
- Infraorder: Cucujiformia
- Family: Cerambycidae
- Genus: Parepectasoides
- Species: P. boliviana

Binomial name
- Parepectasoides boliviana (Breuning, 1974)

Genus of beetles

Parepectasoides boliviana is a species of beetle in the family Cerambycidae, and the only species in the genus Parepectasoides. It was described by Stephan von Breuning in 1974.
