= Mimischnia =

Scientific classification
- Kingdom: Animalia
- Phylum: Arthropoda
- Class: Insecta
- Order: Coleoptera
- Suborder: Polyphaga
- Infraorder: Cucujiformia
- Family: Cerambycidae
- Genus: Mimischnia
- Species: M. ochreosignata

Binomial name
- Mimischnia ochreosignata (Breuning, 1964)

Genus of beetles

Mimischnia ochreosignata is a species of beetle in the family Cerambycidae, and the only species in the genus Mimischnia. It was described by Stephan von Breuning in 1964.
