= Desisella =

Scientific classification
- Kingdom: Animalia
- Phylum: Arthropoda
- Clade: Pancrustacea
- Class: Insecta
- Order: Coleoptera
- Suborder: Polyphaga
- Infraorder: Cucujiformia
- Family: Cerambycidae
- Genus: Desisella
- Species: D. strandiella

Binomial name
- Desisella strandiella Breuning, 1942

Genus of beetles

Desisella is a species of beetle in the family Cerambycidae. Its only species is Desisella strandiella. It was described by Stephan von Breuning in 1942.
