= Zygrita =

Scientific classification
- Kingdom: Animalia
- Phylum: Arthropoda
- Class: Insecta
- Order: Coleoptera
- Suborder: Polyphaga
- Infraorder: Cucujiformia
- Family: Cerambycidae
- Genus: Zygrita
- Species: Z. diva

Binomial name
- Zygrita diva Thomson, 1860

Genus of beetles

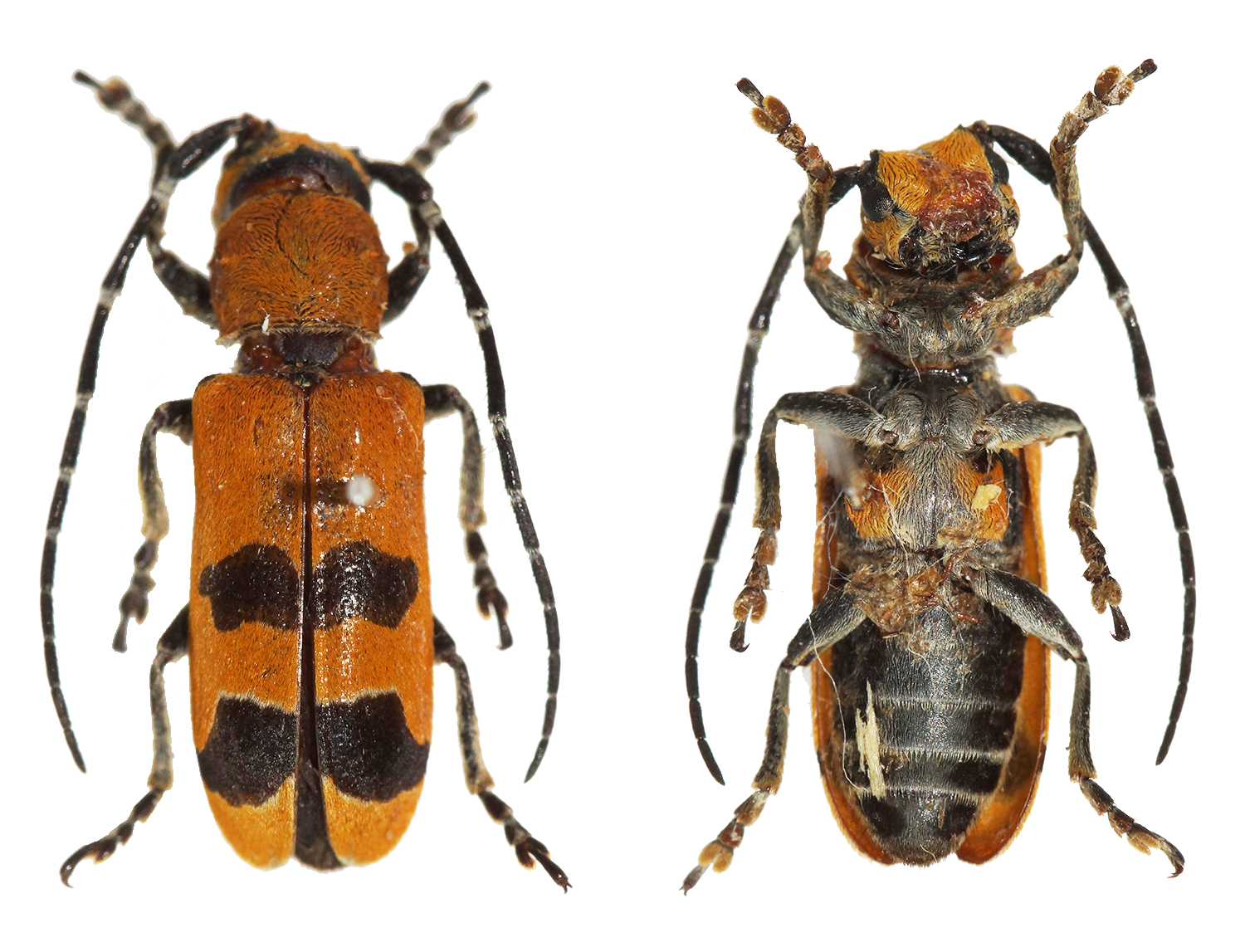

Zygrita diva is a species of beetle in the family Cerambycidae, and the only species in the genus Zygrita. It was described by Thomson in 1860.
