= Mispilopsis =

Scientific classification
- Kingdom: Animalia
- Phylum: Arthropoda
- Class: Insecta
- Order: Coleoptera
- Suborder: Polyphaga
- Infraorder: Cucujiformia
- Family: Cerambycidae
- Genus: Mispilopsis
- Species: M. luzonica

Binomial name
- Mispilopsis luzonica Breuning, 1938

Genus of beetles

Mispilopsis luzonica is a species of beetle in the family Cerambycidae, and the only species in the genus Mispilopsis. It was described by Stephan von Breuning in 1938.
