= Trichoniphona =

Scientific classification
- Kingdom: Animalia
- Phylum: Arthropoda
- Class: Insecta
- Order: Coleoptera
- Suborder: Polyphaga
- Infraorder: Cucujiformia
- Family: Cerambycidae
- Genus: Trichoniphona
- Species: T. albomarmorata

Binomial name
- Trichoniphona albomarmorata Breuning, 1968

Genus of beetles

Trichoniphona albomarmorata is a species of beetle in the family Cerambycidae, and the only species in the genus Trichoniphona. It was described by Stephan von Breuning in 1968.
