= Trichepectasis =

Scientific classification
- Kingdom: Animalia
- Phylum: Arthropoda
- Class: Insecta
- Order: Coleoptera
- Suborder: Polyphaga
- Infraorder: Cucujiformia
- Family: Cerambycidae
- Genus: Trichepectasis
- Species: T. rufescens

Binomial name
- Trichepectasis rufescens Breuning, 1940

Genus of beetles

Trichepectasis rufescens is a species of beetle in the family Cerambycidae, and the only species in the genus Trichepectasis. It was described by Stephan von Breuning in 1940.
