= Parexarrhenus =

Scientific classification
- Kingdom: Animalia
- Phylum: Arthropoda
- Class: Insecta
- Order: Coleoptera
- Suborder: Polyphaga
- Infraorder: Cucujiformia
- Family: Cerambycidae
- Genus: Parexarrhenus
- Species: P. excellens

Binomial name
- Parexarrhenus excellens Breuning, 1938

Genus of beetles

Parexarrhenus excellens is a species of beetle in the family Cerambycidae, and the only species in the genus Parexarrhenus. It was described by Stephan von Breuning in 1938.
