= Parasthenias =

Scientific classification
- Kingdom: Animalia
- Phylum: Arthropoda
- Class: Insecta
- Order: Coleoptera
- Suborder: Polyphaga
- Infraorder: Cucujiformia
- Family: Cerambycidae
- Genus: Parasthenias
- Species: P. fulvotomentosus

Binomial name
- Parasthenias fulvotomentosus Breuning, 1938

Genus of beetles

Parasthenias fulvotomentosus is a species of beetle in the family Cerambycidae, and the only species in the genus Parasthenias. It was described by Stephan von Breuning in 1938.
