= Paracomeron =

Scientific classification
- Kingdom: Animalia
- Phylum: Arthropoda
- Class: Insecta
- Order: Coleoptera
- Suborder: Polyphaga
- Infraorder: Cucujiformia
- Family: Cerambycidae
- Genus: Paracomeron
- Species: P. aurivilliusi

Binomial name
- Paracomeron aurivilliusi Heller, 1913

Genus of beetles

Paracomeron aurivilliusi is a species of beetle in the family Cerambycidae, and the only species in the genus Paracomeron. It was described by Heller in 1913.
