= Tricheczemotes =

Scientific classification
- Kingdom: Animalia
- Phylum: Arthropoda
- Class: Insecta
- Order: Coleoptera
- Suborder: Polyphaga
- Infraorder: Cucujiformia
- Family: Cerambycidae
- Genus: Tricheczemotes
- Species: T. dystasioides

Binomial name
- Tricheczemotes dystasioides Breuning, 1938

Genus of beetles

Tricheczemotes dystasioides is a species of beetle in the family Cerambycidae, and the only species in the genus Tricheczemotes. It was described by Stephan von Breuning in 1938.
