= Trichopenthea =

Scientific classification
- Kingdom: Animalia
- Phylum: Arthropoda
- Class: Insecta
- Order: Coleoptera
- Suborder: Polyphaga
- Infraorder: Cucujiformia
- Family: Cerambycidae
- Genus: Trichopenthea
- Species: T. macularia

Binomial name
- Trichopenthea macularia (Pascoe, 1867)

Genus of beetles

Trichopenthea macularia is a species of beetle in the family Cerambycidae, and the only species in the genus Trichopenthea. It was described by Pascoe in 1867.
