= Parapeleconus =

Scientific classification
- Kingdom: Animalia
- Phylum: Arthropoda
- Class: Insecta
- Order: Coleoptera
- Suborder: Polyphaga
- Infraorder: Cucujiformia
- Family: Cerambycidae
- Genus: Parapeleconus
- Species: P. latefasciatus

Binomial name
- Parapeleconus latefasciatus Breuning, 1970

Genus of beetles

Parapeleconus latefasciatus is a species of beetle in the family Cerambycidae, and the only species in the genus Parapeleconus. It was described by Stephan von Breuning in 1970.
