= Paraphemone =

Scientific classification
- Kingdom: Animalia
- Phylum: Arthropoda
- Class: Insecta
- Order: Coleoptera
- Suborder: Polyphaga
- Infraorder: Cucujiformia
- Family: Cerambycidae
- Genus: Paraphemone
- Species: P. multimaculata

Binomial name
- Paraphemone multimaculata Gressitt, 1935

Genus of beetles

Paraphemone multimaculata is a species of beetle in the family Cerambycidae, and the only species in the genus Paraphemone. It was described by Gressitt in 1935.
