= Mesiphiastus pubiventris =

Scientific classification
- Domain: Eukaryota
- Kingdom: Animalia
- Phylum: Arthropoda
- Class: Insecta
- Order: Coleoptera
- Suborder: Polyphaga
- Infraorder: Cucujiformia
- Family: Cerambycidae
- Tribe: Pteropliini
- Genus: Mesiphiastus
- Species: M. pubiventris

Binomial name
- Mesiphiastus pubiventris (Pascoe, 1862)

Synonyms
- Platyomopsis angasi (Pascoe) Aurivillius, 1922; Symphiletes angasi (Pascoe) Lacordaire, 1872; Symphyletes angasii Pascoe, 1864

Species of beetle

Mesiphiastus pubiventris is a species of beetle in the family Cerambycidae. It was described by Francis Polkinghorne Pascoe in 1862, originally under the genus Symphyletes. It is known from Australia. It feeds on Melaleuca uncinata.
