= Rhytiphora neglecta =

Scientific classification
- Domain: Eukaryota
- Kingdom: Animalia
- Phylum: Arthropoda
- Class: Insecta
- Order: Coleoptera
- Suborder: Polyphaga
- Infraorder: Cucujiformia
- Family: Cerambycidae
- Tribe: Pteropliini
- Genus: Rhytiphora
- Species: R. neglecta

Binomial name
- Rhytiphora neglecta (Pascoe, 1863)

Synonyms
- Platyomopsis egena (Pascoe, 1864); Symphyletes solutus Pascoe, 1863; Symphyletes neglecta Pascoe, 1863; Symphyletes egenus Pascoe, 1864; Symphyletes neglectus Pascoe, 1863

Species of beetle

Rhytiphora neglecta is a species of beetle in the family Cerambycidae. It was described by Francis Polkinghorne Pascoe in 1863, originally under the genus Symphyletes. It is known from Australia. It feeds on Acacia longifolia.
