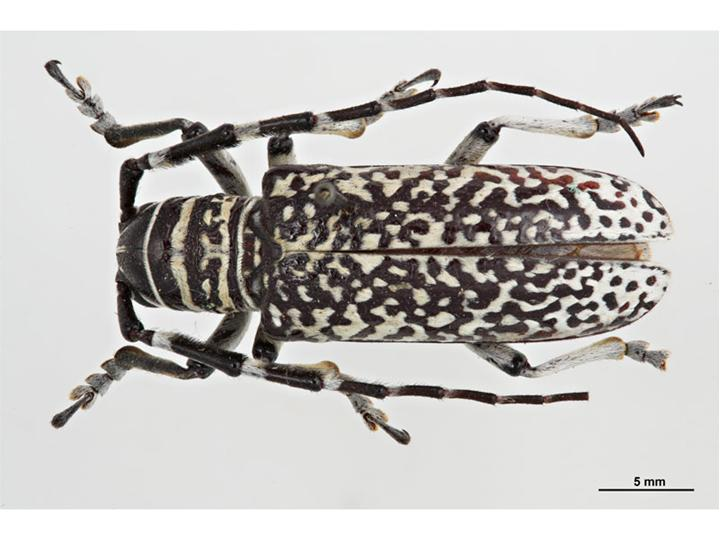
- Rhytiphora saundersii

Scientific classification
- Kingdom: Animalia
- Phylum: Arthropoda
- Clade: Pancrustacea
- Class: Insecta
- Order: Coleoptera
- Suborder: Polyphaga
- Infraorder: Cucujiformia
- Family: Cerambycidae
- Tribe: Pteropliini
- Genus: Rhytiphora; Audinet-Serville, 1835

= Rhytiphora =

Genus of beetles

Rhytiphora is a genus of flat-faced longhorn beetles in the Pteropliini tribe of the subfamily Lamiinae. The genus was first described in 1835 by Jean Guillaume Audinet-Serville.

The Australian longhorn beetles in the subfamily, Lamiinae, were revised in 2013 by Slipinski and Escalona, and the entire genus, Rhytiphora, was revised by Tavikilian and Nearns in 2014. Thus the list of species below may be incomplete.

== Species ==
subgenus Rhytiphora (Platyomopsis) Thomson, 1857

- Rhytiphora albocincta (Guérin-Méneville, 1831)
- Rhytiphora armatula (White, 1859)
- Rhytiphora basalis (Aurivillius, 1917)
- Rhytiphora cana (McKeown, 1948)
- Rhytiphora decipiens (Pascoe, 1863)
- Rhytiphora fraserensis (Blackburn, 1892)
- Rhytiphora frenchi (Blackburn, 1890)
- Rhytiphora mjoebergi (Aurivillius, 1917)
- Rhytiphora multispinis Breuning, 1938
- Rhytiphora nigrovirens (Donovan, 1805)
- Rhytiphora obenbergeri Breuning, 1938
- Rhytiphora obliqua (Donovan, 1805)
- Rhytiphora petrorhiza (Boisduval, 1835)
- Rhytiphora pubiventris (Pascoe, 1862)
- Rhytiphora regularis (Gahan, 1893)
- Rhytiphora spinosa (Thomson, 1864)
- Rhytiphora subminiata (Pascoe, 1866)
- Rhytiphora subregularis Breuning, 1973
- Rhytiphora torquata (Pascoe, 1875)
- Rhytiphora tuberculigera Breuning, 1938
- Rhytiphora vestigialis (Pascoe, 1864)
- Rhytiphora vicaria (Pascoe, 1865)
- Rhytiphora viridescens Breuning, 1938
- Rhytiphora wallacei (Pascoe, 1864)

subgenus Rhytiphora (Rhytiphora) Audinet-Serville, 1835

- Rhytiphora affinis Breuning, 1970
- Rhytiphora albospilota Aurivillius, 1893
- Rhytiphora antennalis Breuning, 1938
- Rhytiphora argentata Breuning, 1938
- Rhytiphora argenteolateralis McKeown, 1948
- Rhytiphora cretata Pascoe, 1859
- Rhytiphora crucensis McKeown, 1948
- Rhytiphora cruciata (Pascoe, 1875)
- Rhytiphora dallasi Pascoe, 1869
- Rhytiphora denisoniana Slipinski & Escalona, 2013 (replaced Hathliodes moratus)
- Rhytiphora frenchiana Breuning, 1961
- Rhytiphora intertincta Pascoe, 1867
- Rhytiphora leucolateralis Breuning, 1970
- Rhytiphora macleayi Lea, 1912
- Rhytiphora marmorea Breuning, 1942
- Rhytiphora mista Newman, 1842
- Rhytiphora ochreomarmorata Breuning, 1939
- Rhytiphora odewahni Pascoe, 1866
- Rhytiphora parantennalis Breuning, 1970
- Rhytiphora polymista Pascoe, 1859
- Rhytiphora rosei Olliff, 1890
- Rhytiphora rubeta Pascoe, 1863
- Rhytiphora rugicollis (Dalman, 1817)
- Rhytiphora sannio Newman, 1838
- Rhytiphora saundersi Pascoe, 1857
- Rhytiphora simsoni Blackburn, 1901
- Rhytiphora subargentata Breuning, 1970
- Rhytiphora transversesulcata Breuning, 1938
- Rhytiphora truncata Breuning, 1940
- Rhytiphora waterhousei Pascoe, 1864

subgenus Rhytiphora (Saperdopsis) Thomson, 1864

- Rhytiphora albescens Breuning, 1938
- Rhytiphora albicollis Breuning, 1938
- Rhytiphora albofasciata Breuning, 1938
- Rhytiphora albolateralis Breuning, 1938
- Rhytiphora albolateraloides Breuning, 1970
- Rhytiphora anaglypta (Pascoe, 1867)
- Rhytiphora arctos (Pascoe, 1865)
- Rhytiphora argus Pascoe, 1867
- Rhytiphora barnardi Breuning, 1982
- Rhytiphora basicristata Breuning, 1938
- Rhytiphora bispinosa Breuning, 1938
- Rhytiphora buruensis Breuning, 1959
- Rhytiphora capreolus (Pascoe, 1867)
- Rhytiphora cinerascens (Aurivillius, 1917)
- Rhytiphora cinnamomea (Pascoe, 1859)
- Rhytiphora corrhenoides Breuning, 1970
- Rhytiphora dawsoni Breuning, 1970
- Rhytiphora dentipes (Blackburn, 1894)
- Rhytiphora deserti (Blackburn, 1896)
- Rhytiphora detrita Hope, 1841
- Rhytiphora devota (Pascoe, 1866)
- Rhytiphora dunni Breuning, 1972
- Rhytiphora farinosa (Pascoe, 1863)
- Rhytiphora fasciata (Blackburn, 1901)
- Rhytiphora ferruginea (Aurivillius, 1917)
- Rhytiphora fumata (Pascoe, 1863)
- Rhytiphora gallus (Pascoe, 1864)
- Rhytiphora heros (Pascoe, 1863)
- Rhytiphora iliaca (Pascoe, 1866)
- Rhytiphora lanosa (Pascoe, 1869)
- Rhytiphora laterialba Breuning, 1938
- Rhytiphora laterivitta Breuning, 1938
- Rhytiphora maculicornis (Pascoe, 1858)
- Rhytiphora marmorata Breuning, 1938
- Rhytiphora modesta (Blackburn, 1890)
- Rhytiphora morata (Pascoe, 1863)
- Rhytiphora neglecta (Pascoe, 1863)
- Rhytiphora neglectoides Breuning, 1966
- Rhytiphora nigroscutellata Breuning, 1966
- Rhytiphora obscura Breuning, 1938
- Rhytiphora obsoleta Breuning, 1938
- Rhytiphora ocellata (Breuning, 1938)
- Rhytiphora ochreobasalis Breuning, 1938
- Rhytiphora ochrescens Breuning, 1970
- Rhytiphora parafarinosa Breuning, 1970
- Rhytiphora pedicornis (Fabricius, 1775)
- Rhytiphora piligera (MacLeay, 1826)
- Rhytiphora pulverulea (Boisduval, 1835)
- Rhytiphora rubriventris (Breuning, 1938)
- Rhytiphora satelles (Pascoe, 1865)
- Rhytiphora sellata Breuning, 1938
- Rhytiphora solandri (Fabricius, 1775)
- Rhytiphora sospitalis Pascoe, 1865
- Rhytiphora tenimberensis Breuning, 1973
- Rhytiphora timorlautensis (Breuning, 1938)
- Rhytiphora ursus (Breuning, 1938)
- Rhytiphora variolosa (Pascoe, 1862)
- Rhytiphora viridis Breuning, 1938

subgenus Setomopsis

- Rhytiphora amicula White, 1859
- Rhytiphora delicatula McKeown, 1948
- Rhytiphora piperitia Hope, 1841
- Rhytiphora uniformis Blackburn, 1901
- Rhytiphora vermiculosa Breuning, 1970

subgenus Rhytiphora (Trichomopsis) Breuning, 1961

- Rhytiphora lateralis (Pascoe, 1858)
- Rhytiphora pulcherrima Breuning, 1965

other

- Rhytiphora bankii (Fabricius, 1775)
- Rhytiphora abdominalis (White, 1858)
