= Rhytiphora deserti =

Scientific classification
- Domain: Eukaryota
- Kingdom: Animalia
- Phylum: Arthropoda
- Class: Insecta
- Order: Coleoptera
- Suborder: Polyphaga
- Infraorder: Cucujiformia
- Family: Cerambycidae
- Tribe: Pteropliini
- Genus: Rhytiphora
- Species: R. deserti

Binomial name
- Rhytiphora deserti (Blackburn, 1896)

Synonyms
- Symphyletes deserti Blackburn, 1896; Platyomopsis deserti (Blackburn) Aurivillius, 1922

Species of beetle

Rhytiphora deserti is a species of beetle in the family Cerambycidae. It was described by Thomas Blackburn in 1896, originally under the genus Symphyletes.
