= Rhytiphora frenchi =

Scientific classification
- Kingdom: Animalia
- Phylum: Arthropoda
- Clade: Pancrustacea
- Class: Insecta
- Order: Coleoptera
- Suborder: Polyphaga
- Infraorder: Cucujiformia
- Family: Cerambycidae
- Genus: Rhytiphora
- Species: R. frenchi

Binomial name
- Rhytiphora frenchi (Blackburn, 1890)

Synonyms
- Symphyletes frenchi Blackburn, 1890; Platyomopsis frenchi (Blackburn) Aurivillius, 1922

Species of beetle

Rhytiphora frenchi is a species of beetle in the family Cerambycidae. It was described by Thomas Blackburn in 1890, originally under the genus Symphyletes. It is known from Australia.
