= Rhytiphora fasciata =

Scientific classification
- Domain: Eukaryota
- Kingdom: Animalia
- Phylum: Arthropoda
- Class: Insecta
- Order: Coleoptera
- Suborder: Polyphaga
- Infraorder: Cucujiformia
- Family: Cerambycidae
- Tribe: Pteropliini
- Genus: Rhytiphora
- Species: R. fasciata

Binomial name
- Rhytiphora fasciata (Blackburn, 1901)

Synonyms
- Symphyletes fasciatus Blackburn, 1901; Platyomopsis fasciata (Blackburn) MacKeown, 1947

Species of beetle

Rhytiphora fasciata is a species of beetle in the family Cerambycidae. It was described by Thomas Blackburn in 1901, originally under the genus Symphyletes. It is known from Australia.
