= Rhytiphora albolateralis =

Scientific classification
- Kingdom: Animalia
- Phylum: Arthropoda
- Clade: Pancrustacea
- Class: Insecta
- Order: Coleoptera
- Suborder: Polyphaga
- Infraorder: Cucujiformia
- Family: Cerambycidae
- Genus: Rhytiphora
- Species: R. albolateralis

Binomial name
- Rhytiphora albolateralis Breuning, 1938

Synonyms
- Platyomopsis albolateralis (Breuning) MacKeown, 1947

Species of beetle

Rhytiphora albolateralis is a species of beetle in the family Cerambycidae. It was first described by Stephan von Breuning in 1938 as Saperdopsis albolateralis. In 1961 von Breuning transferred it to the genus, Rhytiphora. It is known from Australia, its holotype having been collected in Cooktown.
