= Mesiphiastus pallidus =

Scientific classification
- Domain: Eukaryota
- Kingdom: Animalia
- Phylum: Arthropoda
- Class: Insecta
- Order: Coleoptera
- Suborder: Polyphaga
- Infraorder: Cucujiformia
- Family: Cerambycidae
- Tribe: Pteropliini
- Genus: Mesiphiastus
- Species: M. pallidus

Binomial name
- Mesiphiastus pallidus (Aurivillius, 1917)

Synonyms
- Platyomopsis pallida Aurivillius, 1917; Rhytiphora pallida (Aurivillius, 1917)

Species of beetle

Mesiphiastus pallidus is a species of beetle in the family Cerambycidae. It was described by Per Olof Christopher Aurivillius in 1917, originally under the genus Platyomopsis.
