= Rhytiphora piperitia =

Scientific classification
- Domain: Eukaryota
- Kingdom: Animalia
- Phylum: Arthropoda
- Class: Insecta
- Order: Coleoptera
- Suborder: Polyphaga
- Infraorder: Cucujiformia
- Family: Cerambycidae
- Tribe: Pteropliini
- Genus: Rhytiphora
- Species: R. piperitia

Binomial name
- Rhytiphora piperitia Hope, 1841

Synonyms
- Symphyletes humeralis White, 1858; Platyomopsis humeralis (White) Aurivillius, 1922

Species of beetle

Rhytiphora piperitia is a species of beetle in the family Cerambycidae. It was described by Frederick William Hope in 1841. It is known from Australia.
