= Rhytiphora dentipes =

Scientific classification
- Domain: Eukaryota
- Kingdom: Animalia
- Phylum: Arthropoda
- Class: Insecta
- Order: Coleoptera
- Suborder: Polyphaga
- Infraorder: Cucujiformia
- Family: Cerambycidae
- Tribe: Pteropliini
- Genus: Rhytiphora
- Species: R. dentipes

Binomial name
- Rhytiphora dentipes (Blackburn, 1894)

Synonyms
- Symphyletes dentipes Blackburn, 1894; Platyomopsis dentipes (Blackburn) Aurivillius, 1922

Species of beetle

Rhytiphora dentipes is a species of beetle in the family Cerambycidae. It was described by Thomas Blackburn in 1894. It is known from Australia.
