= Rhytiphora iliaca =

Scientific classification
- Domain: Eukaryota
- Kingdom: Animalia
- Phylum: Arthropoda
- Class: Insecta
- Order: Coleoptera
- Suborder: Polyphaga
- Infraorder: Cucujiformia
- Family: Cerambycidae
- Tribe: Pteropliini
- Genus: Rhytiphora
- Species: R. iliaca

Binomial name
- Rhytiphora iliaca (Pascoe, 1866)

Synonyms
- Symphyletes iliacus Pascoe, 1866; Platyomopsis iliaca (Pascoe) Aurivillius, 1922

Species of beetle

Rhytiphora iliaca is a species of beetle in the family Cerambycidae. It was described by Francis Polkinghorne Pascoe in 1866. It is known from Australia.
