= Rhytiphora macleayi =

Scientific classification
- Domain: Eukaryota
- Kingdom: Animalia
- Phylum: Arthropoda
- Class: Insecta
- Order: Coleoptera
- Suborder: Polyphaga
- Infraorder: Cucujiformia
- Family: Cerambycidae
- Tribe: Pteropliini
- Genus: Rhytiphora
- Species: R. macleayi

Binomial name
- Rhytiphora macleayi Lea, 1912

Synonyms
- Rhytiphora browni McKeown, 1935

Species of beetle

Rhytiphora macleayi is a species of beetle in the family Cerambycidae. It was described by Lea in 1912. It is known from Australia.
