= Rhytiphora heros =

Scientific classification
- Domain: Eukaryota
- Kingdom: Animalia
- Phylum: Arthropoda
- Class: Insecta
- Order: Coleoptera
- Suborder: Polyphaga
- Infraorder: Cucujiformia
- Family: Cerambycidae
- Tribe: Pteropliini
- Genus: Rhytiphora
- Species: R. heros

Binomial name
- Rhytiphora heros (Pascoe, 1863)

Synonyms
- Symphyletes heros Pascoe, 1863; Iphiastos heros (Pascoe) Pascoe, 1865

Species of beetle

Rhytiphora heros is a species of beetle in the family Cerambycidae. It was first described by Francis Polkinghorne Pascoe in 1863, under the original genus Iphiastos. This species is known to inhabit Australia.
