= Rhytiphora antennalis =

Scientific classification
- Kingdom: Animalia
- Phylum: Arthropoda
- Class: Insecta
- Order: Coleoptera
- Suborder: Polyphaga
- Infraorder: Cucujiformia
- Family: Cerambycidae
- Genus: Rhytiphora
- Species: R. antennalis

Binomial name
- Rhytiphora antennalis Breuning, 1938

Species of beetle

Rhytiphora antennalis is a species of beetle in the family Cerambycidae. It was described by Stephan von Breuning in 1938. It is known from Australia.
