= Rhytiphora wallacei =

Scientific classification
- Kingdom: Animalia
- Phylum: Arthropoda
- Class: Insecta
- Order: Coleoptera
- Suborder: Polyphaga
- Infraorder: Cucujiformia
- Family: Cerambycidae
- Genus: Rhytiphora
- Species: R. wallacei

Binomial name
- Rhytiphora wallacei (Pascoe, 1864)

Synonyms
- Symphyletes wallacei Pascoe, 1864; Platyomopsis wallacei (Pascoe, 1864)

Species of beetle

Rhytiphora wallacei is a species of beetle in the family Cerambycidae. It was described by Francis Polkinghorne Pascoe in 1864. It is known from Papua New Guinea and Moluccas.
