= Rhytiphora delicatula =

Scientific classification
- Domain: Eukaryota
- Kingdom: Animalia
- Phylum: Arthropoda
- Class: Insecta
- Order: Coleoptera
- Suborder: Polyphaga
- Infraorder: Cucujiformia
- Family: Cerambycidae
- Tribe: Pteropliini
- Genus: Rhytiphora
- Species: R. delicatula

Binomial name
- Rhytiphora delicatula McKeown, 1948

Species of beetle

Rhytiphora delicatula is a species of beetle in the family Cerambycidae. It was described by McKeown in 1948.
