= Rhytiphora albocincta =

Scientific classification
- Kingdom: Animalia
- Phylum: Arthropoda
- Clade: Pancrustacea
- Class: Insecta
- Order: Coleoptera
- Suborder: Polyphaga
- Infraorder: Cucujiformia
- Family: Cerambycidae
- Genus: Rhytiphora
- Species: R. albocincta

Binomial name
- Rhytiphora albocincta (Guérin-Méneville, 1831)

Synonyms
- Rhytiphora donovani Newman, 1851; Platyomopsis albocincta (Guérin-Méneville) Aurivillius, 1922; Symphyletes albocinctus (Guérin-Méneville) Froggatt, 1893; Saperda albocincta Guérin-Méneville, 1831

Species of beetle

Rhytiphora albocincta is a species of beetle in the family Cerambycidae. It was described by Félix Édouard Guérin-Méneville in 1831, originally under the genus Saperda. It is known from Australia. It feeds on Acacia pubescens and Acacia longifolia. It contains the variety Rhytiphora albocincta var. compos.
