= Rhytiphora fraserensis =

Scientific classification
- Domain: Eukaryota
- Kingdom: Animalia
- Phylum: Arthropoda
- Class: Insecta
- Order: Coleoptera
- Suborder: Polyphaga
- Infraorder: Cucujiformia
- Family: Cerambycidae
- Tribe: Pteropliini
- Genus: Rhytiphora
- Species: R. fraserensis

Binomial name
- Rhytiphora fraserensis (Blackburn, 1892)

Synonyms
- Symphyletes fraserensis Blackburn, 1892; Platyomopsis fraserensis (Blackburn) Aurivillius, 1922

Species of beetle

Rhytiphora fraserensis is a species of beetle in the family Cerambycidae. It was described by Thomas Blackburn in 1892. It is known from Australia.
