= Hathliodes =

Scientific classification
- Domain: Eukaryota
- Kingdom: Animalia
- Phylum: Arthropoda
- Class: Insecta
- Order: Coleoptera
- Suborder: Polyphaga
- Infraorder: Cucujiformia
- Family: Cerambycidae
- Tribe: Pteropliini
- Genus: Hathliodes

Genus of beetles

Hathliodes is a genus of longhorn beetles of the subfamily Lamiinae, containing the following species:

subgenus Hathliodes

- Hathliodes costulatus Pascoe, 1867
- Hathliodes fuscovittatus Breuning, 1940
- Hathliodes grammicus (Pascoe, 1859)
- Hathliodes moratus Pascoe, 1866
- Hathliodes persimilis Breuning, 1938
- Hathliodes virgatus Breuning, 1938

subgenus Trichohathlia

- Hathliodes pseudomurinus Breuning, 1938
