= Mesiphiastus =

Scientific classification
- Kingdom: Animalia
- Phylum: Arthropoda
- Class: Insecta
- Order: Coleoptera
- Suborder: Polyphaga
- Infraorder: Cucujiformia
- Family: Cerambycidae
- Tribe: Pteropliini
- Genus: Mesiphiastus

Genus of beetles

Mesiphiastus is a genus of longhorn beetles of the subfamily Lamiinae, containing the following species:

subgenus Mesiphiastus

- Mesiphiastus fulvescens (Pascoe, 1863)
- Mesiphiastus lentus (Blackburn, 1901)
- Mesiphiastus pallidus (Aurivillius, 1917)
- Mesiphiastus subfulvescens Breuning, 1970
- Mesiphiastus subtuberculatus (White, 1858)

subgenus Pubiphiastus

- Mesiphiastus laterialbus Breuning, 1970
- Mesiphiastus pubiventris (Pascoe, 1862)
