= Mesiphiastus lentus =

Scientific classification
- Domain: Eukaryota
- Kingdom: Animalia
- Phylum: Arthropoda
- Class: Insecta
- Order: Coleoptera
- Suborder: Polyphaga
- Infraorder: Cucujiformia
- Family: Cerambycidae
- Tribe: Pteropliini
- Genus: Mesiphiastus
- Species: M. lentus

Binomial name
- Mesiphiastus lentus (Blackburn, 1901)

Synonyms
- Platyomopsis lenta (Blackburn) Aurivillius, 1922; Symphyletes lentus Blackburn, 1901

Species of beetle

Mesiphiastus lentus is a species of beetle in the family Cerambycidae. It was described by Thomas Blackburn in 1901. It is known from Australia.
