= Rhytiphora detrita =

Scientific classification
- Domain: Eukaryota
- Kingdom: Animalia
- Phylum: Arthropoda
- Class: Insecta
- Order: Coleoptera
- Suborder: Polyphaga
- Infraorder: Cucujiformia
- Family: Cerambycidae
- Tribe: Pteropliini
- Genus: Rhytiphora
- Species: R. detrita

Binomial name
- Rhytiphora detrita Hope, 1841

Species of beetle

Rhytiphora detrita is a species of beetle in the family Cerambycidae. It was described by Frederick William Hope in 1841. It is known from Australia.
