= Rhytiphora basalis =

Scientific classification
- Domain: Eukaryota
- Kingdom: Animalia
- Phylum: Arthropoda
- Class: Insecta
- Order: Coleoptera
- Suborder: Polyphaga
- Infraorder: Cucujiformia
- Family: Cerambycidae
- Tribe: Pteropliini
- Genus: Rhytiphora
- Species: R. basalis

Binomial name
- Rhytiphora basalis (Aurivillius, 1917)

Synonyms
- Platyomopsis basalis Aurivillius, 1917

Species of beetle

Rhytiphora basalis is a species of beetle in the family Cerambycidae. It was described by Per Olof Christopher Aurivillius in 1917. It is known from Australia.
