= Rhytiphora decipiens =

Scientific classification
- Domain: Eukaryota
- Kingdom: Animalia
- Phylum: Arthropoda
- Class: Insecta
- Order: Coleoptera
- Suborder: Polyphaga
- Infraorder: Cucujiformia
- Family: Cerambycidae
- Tribe: Pteropliini
- Genus: Rhytiphora
- Species: R. decipiens

Binomial name
- Rhytiphora decipiens (Pascoe, 1863)

Synonyms
- Platyomopsis decipiens (Pascoe, 1863); Platyomopsis bathursti (Pascoe, 1866); Platyomopsis derasa (Pascoe, 1863); Symphyletes derasus Pascoe, 1863; Symphyletes bathursti Pascoe, 1866; Symphyletes decipiens Pascoe, 1863

Species of beetle

Rhytiphora decipiens is a species of beetle in the family Cerambycidae. It was described by Francis Polkinghorne Pascoe in 1863. It is known from Australia.
