= Rhytiphora vestigialis =

Scientific classification
- Domain: Eukaryota
- Kingdom: Animalia
- Phylum: Arthropoda
- Class: Insecta
- Order: Coleoptera
- Suborder: Polyphaga
- Infraorder: Cucujiformia
- Family: Cerambycidae
- Tribe: Pteropliini
- Genus: Rhytiphora
- Species: R. vestigialis

Binomial name
- Rhytiphora vestigialis (Pascoe, 1864)

Synonyms
- ?Saperda collaris Donovan, 1805; Symphyletes vestigialis Pascoe, 1864; Platyomopsis vestigialis (Pascoe) Aurivillius, 1922; ?Platyomopsis collaris (Donovan) Aurivillius, 1922

Species of beetle

Rhytiphora vestigialis is a species of beetle in the family Cerambycidae. It was described by Francis Polkinghorne Pascoe in 1864. It is known from Australia.
