= Rhytiphora albescens =

Scientific classification
- Kingdom: Animalia
- Phylum: Arthropoda
- Class: Insecta
- Order: Coleoptera
- Suborder: Polyphaga
- Infraorder: Cucujiformia
- Family: Cerambycidae
- Genus: Rhytiphora
- Species: R. albescens

Binomial name
- Rhytiphora albescens Breuning, 1938

Synonyms
- Rhytiphora sherbockensis Tavakilian & Nearns, 2014; Saperdopsis albescens Breuning, 1938; Platyomopsis albescens (Breuning, 1938)

Species of beetle

Rhytiphora albescens is a species of beetle in the family Cerambycidae. It was described by Stephan von Breuning in 1938. It is known from Australia.
