= Rhytiphora morata =

Scientific classification
- Domain: Eukaryota
- Kingdom: Animalia
- Phylum: Arthropoda
- Class: Insecta
- Order: Coleoptera
- Suborder: Polyphaga
- Infraorder: Cucujiformia
- Family: Cerambycidae
- Tribe: Pteropliini
- Genus: Rhytiphora
- Species: R. morata

Binomial name
- Rhytiphora morata (Pascoe, 1863)

Synonyms
- Symphyletes moratus Pascoe, 1863; Platyomopsis morata (Pascoe) Aurivillius, 1922

Species of beetle

Rhytiphora morata is a species of beetle in the family Cerambycidae. It was described by Francis Polkinghorne Pascoe in 1863. It is known from Australia.
