= Rhytiphora truncata =

Scientific classification
- Kingdom: Animalia
- Phylum: Arthropoda
- Class: Insecta
- Order: Coleoptera
- Suborder: Polyphaga
- Infraorder: Cucujiformia
- Family: Cerambycidae
- Genus: Rhytiphora
- Species: R. truncata

Binomial name
- Rhytiphora truncata Breuning, 1940

Synonyms
- Rhytiphora truncatoides Tavakilian & Nearns, 2014

Species of beetle

Rhytiphora truncata is a species of beetle in the family Cerambycidae. It was described by Stephan von Breuning in 1940. It is known from Australia.
