= Rhytiphora viridescens =

Scientific classification
- Kingdom: Animalia
- Phylum: Arthropoda
- Class: Insecta
- Order: Coleoptera
- Suborder: Polyphaga
- Infraorder: Cucujiformia
- Family: Cerambycidae
- Genus: Rhytiphora
- Species: R. viridescens

Binomial name
- Rhytiphora viridescens Breuning, 1938

Synonyms
- Platyomopsis viridescens (Breuning) MacKeown, 1947

Species of beetle

Rhytiphora viridescens is a species of beetle in the family Cerambycidae. It was described by Stephan von Breuning in 1938. It is known from Australia.
