= Rhytiphora modesta =

Scientific classification
- Domain: Eukaryota
- Kingdom: Animalia
- Phylum: Arthropoda
- Class: Insecta
- Order: Coleoptera
- Suborder: Polyphaga
- Infraorder: Cucujiformia
- Family: Cerambycidae
- Tribe: Pteropliini
- Genus: Rhytiphora
- Species: R. modesta

Binomial name
- Rhytiphora modesta (Blackburn, 1890)

Synonyms
- Platyomopsis modestus (Blackburn, 1890)

Species of beetle

Rhytiphora modesta is a species of beetle in the family Cerambycidae. It was described by Thomas Blackburn in 1890. It is known from Australia.
