= Rhytiphora subregularis =

Scientific classification
- Kingdom: Animalia
- Phylum: Arthropoda
- Class: Insecta
- Order: Coleoptera
- Suborder: Polyphaga
- Infraorder: Cucujiformia
- Family: Cerambycidae
- Subfamily: Lamiinae
- Tribe: Pteropliini
- Genus: Rhytiphora
- Species: R. subregularis

Binomial name
- Rhytiphora subregularis Breuning, 1973

Synonyms
- Rhytiphora (Platyomopsis) subregularis Breuning, 1973

Species of beetle

Rhytiphora subregularis is a species of beetle in the family Cerambycidae, subfamily Lamiinae, and tribe Pteropliini. It was described by Stephan von Breuning in 1973 based on a specimen from Queensland, Australia.

== Taxonomy and classification ==
- Rhytiphora subregularis belongs to the genus Rhytiphora, which includes approximately 142 species and subspecies.
- It is classified in the tribe Pteropliini, which consists of around 2,133 species and subspecies.
- The species was originally described as Rhytiphora (Platyomopsis) subregularis by Breuning, emphasizing its placement in the subgenus Platyomopsis.

== Distribution ==
Rhytiphora subregularis is known to occur in Australia, with its type locality being Queensland.

== Bibliography ==
Significant references pertaining to this species:

- Breuning, S. (1973). Rhytiphora (Platyomopsis) subregularis. Folia Entomologica Hungarica, 26: 14. [New locality and division].
- Ashman, T.; Slipinski, A.; Lawrence, J. F. (2023). Rhytiphora subregularis. Zootaxa, 5312(1): 56. [Illustrated figures, including holotype].

== Figures ==
The holotype of Rhytiphora subregularis was figured in Ashman et al. (2023) in their study on the species.
