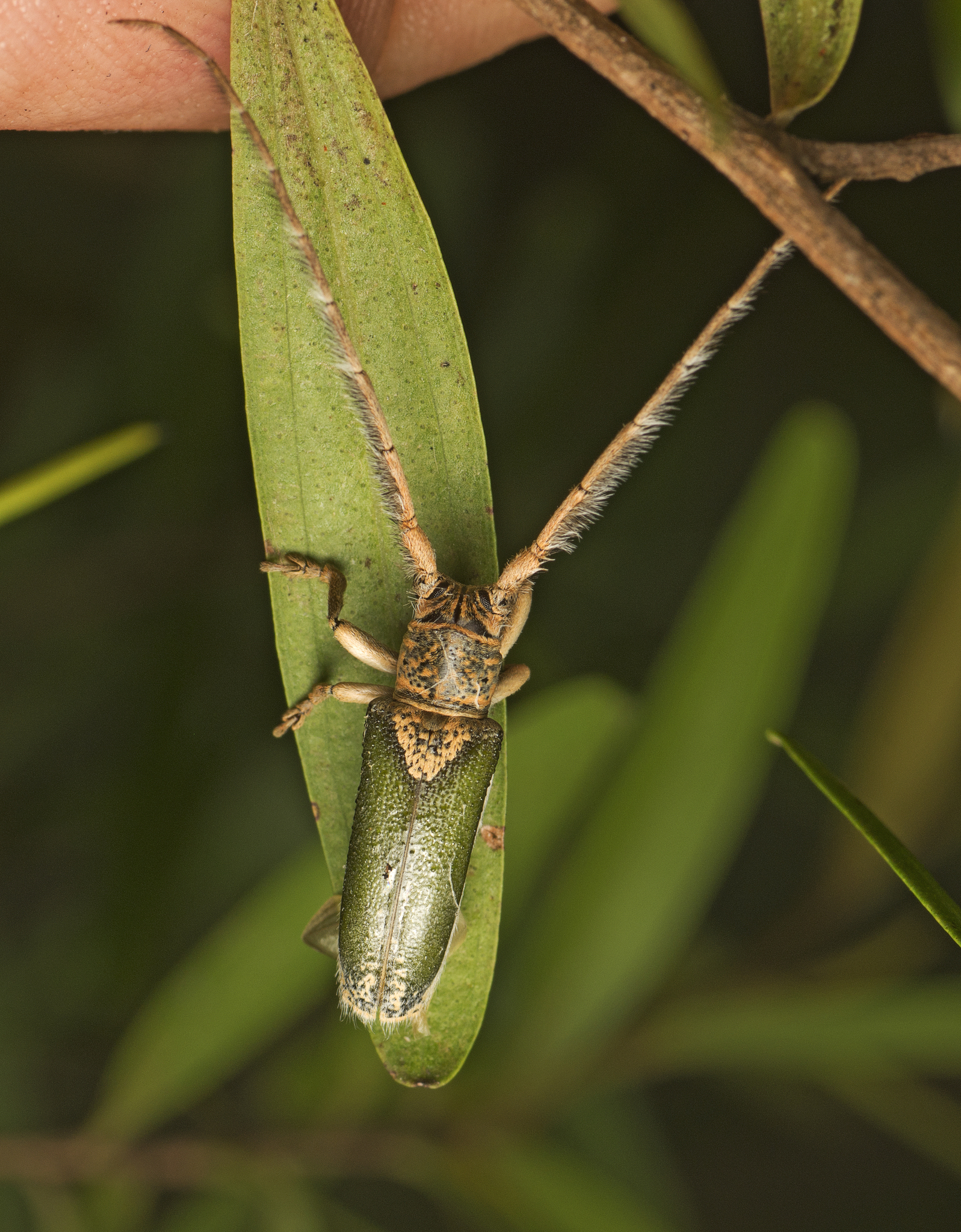

Scientific classification
- Domain: Eukaryota
- Kingdom: Animalia
- Phylum: Arthropoda
- Class: Insecta
- Order: Coleoptera
- Suborder: Polyphaga
- Infraorder: Cucujiformia
- Family: Cerambycidae
- Tribe: Pteropliini
- Genus: Rhytiphora
- Species: R. nigrovirens

Binomial name
- Rhytiphora nigrovirens (Donovan, 1805)

Synonyms
- Saperda nigrovirens Donovan, 1805; Platyomopsis nigrovirens (Donovan) Aurivillius, 1922; Symphyletes nigrovirens (Donovan) Best, 1881

= Rhytiphora nigrovirens =

Species of beetle

Rhytiphora nigrovirens is a species of beetle in the family Cerambycidae. It was described by Edward Donovan in 1805, originally under the genus Saperda. It is known from Australia.
