= Hathliodes fuscovittatus =

Scientific classification
- Kingdom: Animalia
- Phylum: Arthropoda
- Class: Insecta
- Order: Coleoptera
- Suborder: Polyphaga
- Infraorder: Cucujiformia
- Family: Cerambycidae
- Genus: Hathliodes
- Species: H. fuscovittatus

Binomial name
- Hathliodes fuscovittatus Breuning, 1940

Species of beetle

Hathliodes fuscovittatus is a species of beetle in the family Cerambycidae. It was described by Stephan von Breuning in 1940.
