= Corrhenes crassicollis =

Scientific classification
- Domain: Eukaryota
- Kingdom: Animalia
- Phylum: Arthropoda
- Class: Insecta
- Order: Coleoptera
- Suborder: Polyphaga
- Infraorder: Cucujiformia
- Family: Cerambycidae
- Tribe: Pteropliini
- Genus: Corrhenes
- Species: C. crassicollis

Binomial name
- Corrhenes crassicollis (Pascoe, 1864)

Synonyms
- Penthea crassicollis Pascoe, 1864

Species of beetle

Corrhenes crassicollis is a species of beetle in the family Cerambycidae. It was described by Francis Polkinghorne Pascoe in 1864. It is known from Australia. It contains the varietas Corrhenes crassicollis var. picta.
