= Hathliodes virgatus =

Scientific classification
- Kingdom: Animalia
- Phylum: Arthropoda
- Class: Insecta
- Order: Coleoptera
- Suborder: Polyphaga
- Infraorder: Cucujiformia
- Family: Cerambycidae
- Genus: Hathliodes
- Species: H. virgatus

Binomial name
- Hathliodes virgatus Breuning, 1938

Species of beetle

Hathliodes virgatus is a species of beetle in the family Cerambycidae. It was described by Stephan von Breuning in 1938. It is known from Australia.
