= Rhytiphora solandri =

Scientific classification
- Domain: Eukaryota
- Kingdom: Animalia
- Phylum: Arthropoda
- Class: Insecta
- Order: Coleoptera
- Suborder: Polyphaga
- Infraorder: Cucujiformia
- Family: Cerambycidae
- Tribe: Pteropliini
- Genus: Rhytiphora
- Species: R. solandri

Binomial name
- Rhytiphora solandri (Fabricius, 1775)

Synonyms
- Lamia solandri Fabricius, 1775; Depsages solandri (Fabricius) McKeown, 1937; Symphyletes solandri (Fabricius) Froggatt, 1894; Saperda leprosa Boisduval, 1835; Rhytiphora leprosa (Boisduval) Aurivillius, 1922

Species of beetle

Rhytiphora solandri is a species of beetle in the family Cerambycidae. It was described by Johan Christian Fabricius in 1775. It is known from Australia.
