= Rhytiphora rugicollis =

Scientific classification
- Domain: Eukaryota
- Kingdom: Animalia
- Phylum: Arthropoda
- Class: Insecta
- Order: Coleoptera
- Suborder: Polyphaga
- Infraorder: Cucujiformia
- Family: Cerambycidae
- Tribe: Pteropliini
- Genus: Rhytiphora
- Species: R. rugicollis

Binomial name
- Rhytiphora rugicollis (Dalman, 1817)

Synonyms
- Saperda rugicollis (Dalman, 1817); Lamia porphyrea Boisduval, 1835; Lamia rugicollis Dalman, 1817

Species of beetle

Rhytiphora rugicollis is a species of beetle in the family Cerambycidae, and the type species of its genus. It was described by Dalman in 1817, originally under the genus Lamia. It is known from Australia.
