= Hathliodes pseudomurinus =

Scientific classification
- Kingdom: Animalia
- Phylum: Arthropoda
- Class: Insecta
- Order: Coleoptera
- Suborder: Polyphaga
- Infraorder: Cucujiformia
- Family: Cerambycidae
- Genus: Hathliodes
- Species: H. pseudomurinus

Binomial name
- Hathliodes pseudomurinus Breuning, 1938

Synonyms
- Hathliodes murinus (Pascoe) Aurivillius, 1917

Species of beetle

Hathliodes pseudomurinus is a species of beetle in the family Cerambycidae. It was described by Stephan von Breuning in 1938. It is known from Australia.
