= Rhytiphora variolosa =

Scientific classification
- Domain: Eukaryota
- Kingdom: Animalia
- Phylum: Arthropoda
- Class: Insecta
- Order: Coleoptera
- Suborder: Polyphaga
- Infraorder: Cucujiformia
- Family: Cerambycidae
- Tribe: Pteropliini
- Genus: Rhytiphora
- Species: R. variolosa

Binomial name
- Rhytiphora variolosa (Pascoe, 1862)

Synonyms
- Platyomopsis variolosa Pascoe, 1862

Species of beetle

Rhytiphora variolosa is a species of beetle in the family Cerambycidae. It was described by Francis Polkinghorne Pascoe in 1862. It is known from Australia.
