= Rhytiphora armatula =

Scientific classification
- Domain: Eukaryota
- Kingdom: Animalia
- Phylum: Arthropoda
- Class: Insecta
- Order: Coleoptera
- Suborder: Polyphaga
- Infraorder: Cucujiformia
- Family: Cerambycidae
- Tribe: Pteropliini
- Genus: Rhytiphora
- Species: R. armatula

Binomial name
- Rhytiphora armatula (White, 1859)

Synonyms
- Symphyletes (Platyomopsis) armatulus White, 1859; Platyomopsis armatula (White) Aurivillius, 1922

Species of beetle

Rhytiphora armatula is a species of beetle in the family Cerambycidae. It was described by White in 1859.
