= Corrhenes paulla =

Scientific classification
- Domain: Eukaryota
- Kingdom: Animalia
- Phylum: Arthropoda
- Class: Insecta
- Order: Coleoptera
- Suborder: Polyphaga
- Infraorder: Cucujiformia
- Family: Cerambycidae
- Tribe: Pteropliini
- Genus: Corrhenes
- Species: C. paulla

Binomial name
- Corrhenes paulla (Germar, 1848)

Species of beetle

Corrhenes paulla is a species of beetle in the family Cerambycidae. It was first described by Ernst Friedrich Germar in 1848 as Saperda paulla. It is known from Australia. The Australian Faunal Directory gives the accepted name for this species as Rhytiphora paulla.

== Subspecies ==
- Corrhenes paulla fuscosignata Breuning, 1970
- Corrhenes paulla paulla (Germar, 1865)
