= Rhytiphora frenchiana =

Scientific classification
- Kingdom: Animalia
- Phylum: Arthropoda
- Class: Insecta
- Order: Coleoptera
- Suborder: Polyphaga
- Infraorder: Cucujiformia
- Family: Cerambycidae
- Genus: Rhytiphora
- Species: R. frenchiana

Binomial name
- Rhytiphora frenchiana Breuning, 1961

Synonyms
- Rhytiphora frenchi Blackburn, 1895 nec 1890

Species of beetle

Rhytiphora frenchiana is a species of beetle in the family Cerambycidae. It was described by Stephan von Breuning in 1961. It is found in Australia.
