= Rhytiphora pedicornis =

Scientific classification
- Domain: Eukaryota
- Kingdom: Animalia
- Phylum: Arthropoda
- Class: Insecta
- Order: Coleoptera
- Suborder: Polyphaga
- Infraorder: Cucujiformia
- Family: Cerambycidae
- Tribe: Pteropliini
- Genus: Rhytiphora
- Species: R. pedicornis

Binomial name
- Rhytiphora pedicornis (Fabricius, 1775)

Synonyms
- Rhytophora tuberculata Hope, 1841; Lamia pedicornis Fabricius, 1775; Platyomopsis pedicornis (Fabricius) MacKeown, 1947

Species of beetle

Rhytiphora pedicornis is a species of beetle in the family Cerambycidae. It was described by Johan Christian Fabricius in 1775. It is known from Australia.
