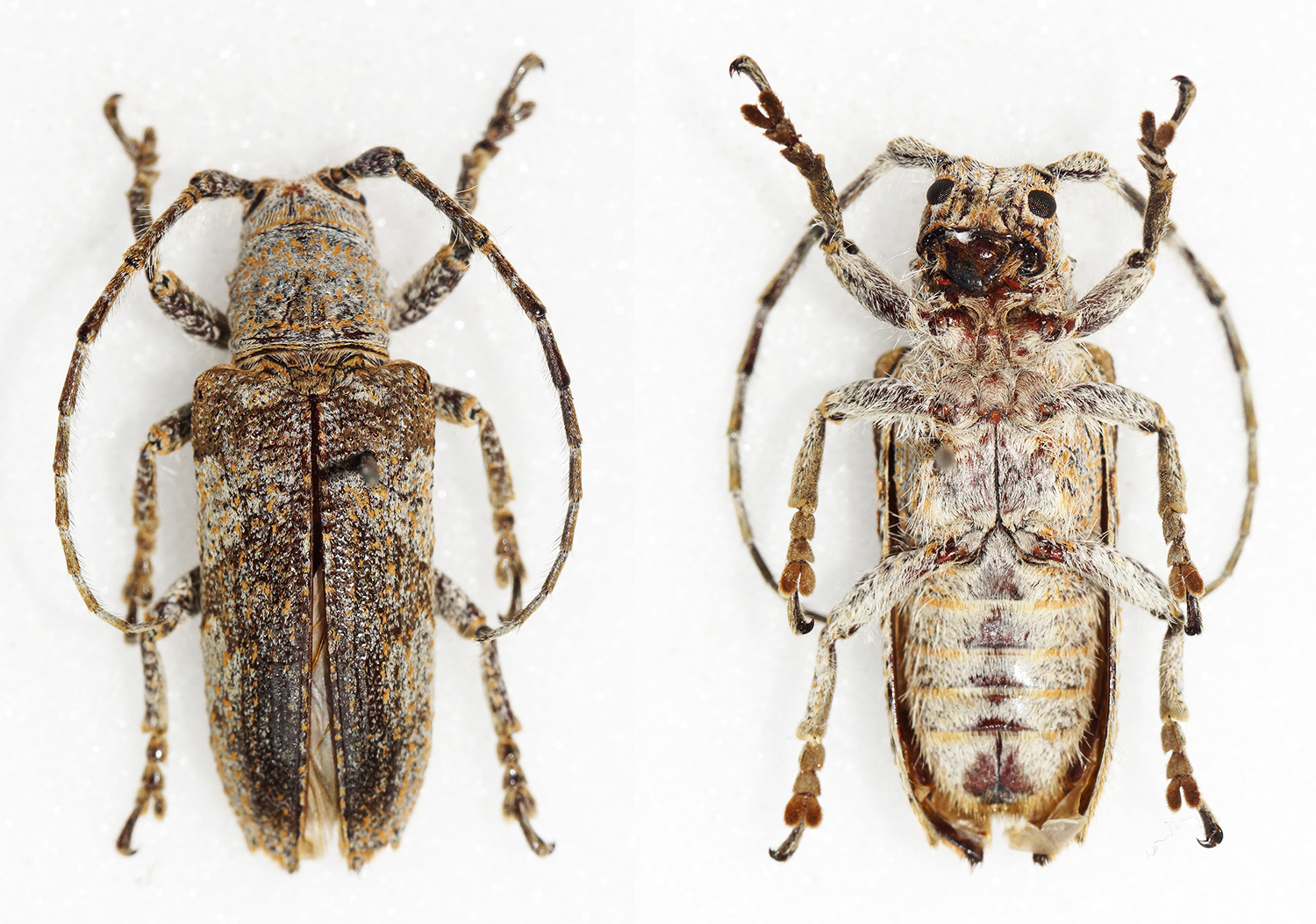

Scientific classification
- Domain: Eukaryota
- Kingdom: Animalia
- Phylum: Arthropoda
- Class: Insecta
- Order: Coleoptera
- Suborder: Polyphaga
- Infraorder: Cucujiformia
- Family: Cerambycidae
- Tribe: Pteropliini
- Genus: Rhytiphora
- Species: R. pulverulea

Binomial name
- Rhytiphora pulverulea (Boisduval, 1835)

Synonyms
- Platyomopsis pulverulens (Boisduval, 1835); Lamia pulverulens Boisduval, 1835; Rhytiphora (Platyomopsis) pulverulea (Boisduval, 1835); Symphyletes munitus Pascoe, 1863; Symphyletes ingestus Pascoe, 1863; Symphyletes sodalis Pascoe, 1859

= Rhytiphora pulverulea =

Species of beetle

Rhytiphora pulverulea is a species of beetle in the family Cerambycidae. It was described by Jean Baptiste Boisduval in 1835. It is known from Australia.
