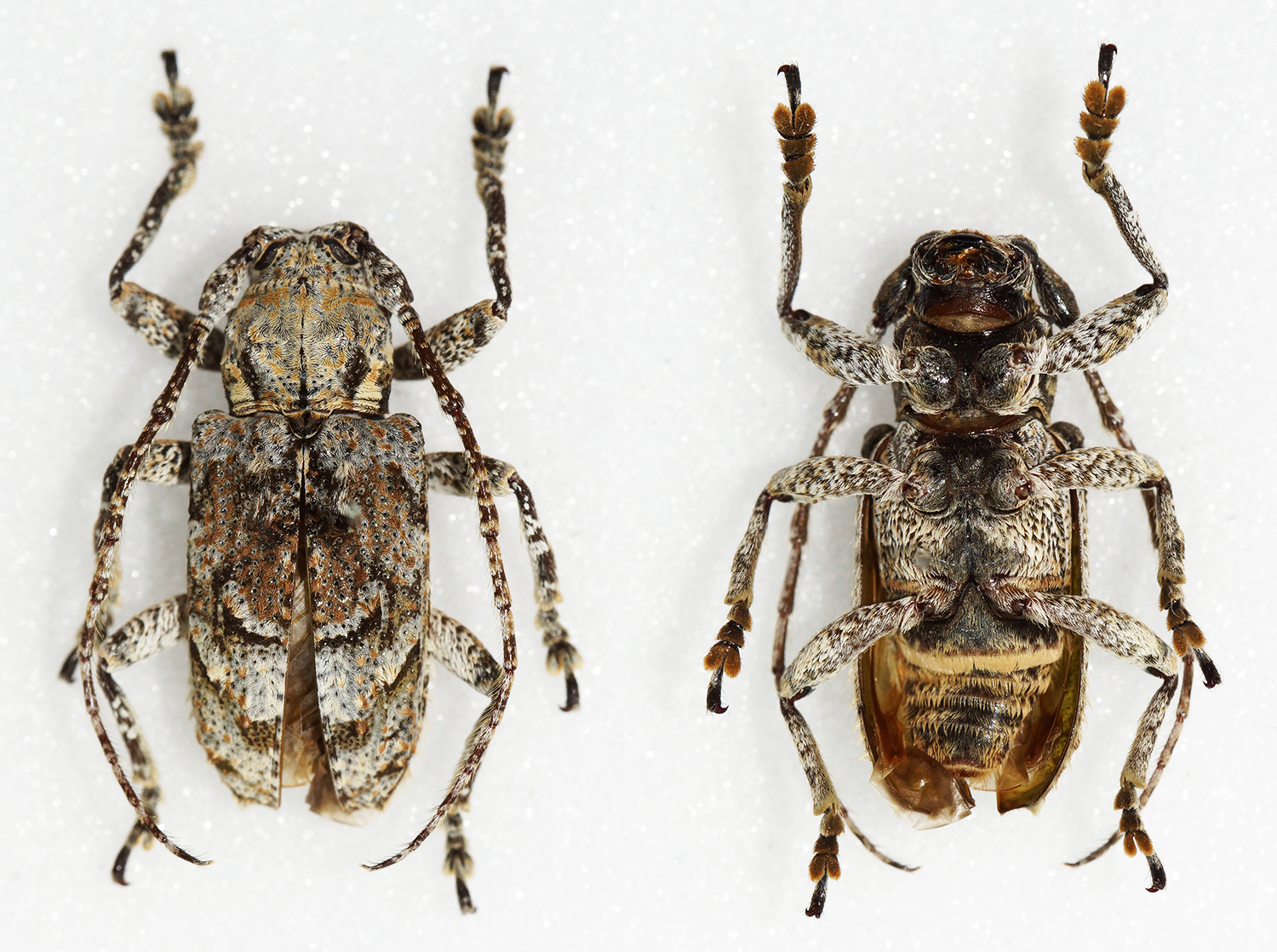
- Sex: Male

Scientific classification
- Domain: Eukaryota
- Kingdom: Animalia
- Phylum: Arthropoda
- Class: Insecta
- Order: Coleoptera
- Suborder: Polyphaga
- Infraorder: Cucujiformia
- Family: Cerambycidae
- Tribe: Pteropliini
- Genus: Rhytiphora
- Species: R. maculicornis

Binomial name
- Rhytiphora maculicornis (Pascoe, 1858)

Synonyms
- Rhytiphora semivestita Pascoe, 1866; Platyomopsis maculicornis (Pascoe) Aurivillius, 1922; Symphyletes maculicornis Pascoe, 1858

= Rhytiphora maculicornis =

Species of beetle

Rhytiphora maculicornis is a species of beetle in the family Cerambycidae. It was described by Francis Polkinghorne Pascoe in 1858. It is from Australia.
