= Rhytiphora cinnamomea =

Scientific classification
- Domain: Eukaryota
- Kingdom: Animalia
- Phylum: Arthropoda
- Class: Insecta
- Order: Coleoptera
- Suborder: Polyphaga
- Infraorder: Cucujiformia
- Family: Cerambycidae
- Tribe: Pteropliini
- Genus: Rhytiphora
- Species: R. cinnamomea

Binomial name
- Rhytiphora cinnamomea (Pascoe, 1859)

Synonyms
- Rhytiphora (Saperdopsis) cinnanomea (Pascoe, 1859); Platyomopsis deflorata (Pascoe, 1869); Platyomopsis cinnamomea (Pascoe, 1859); Symphyletes defloratus Pascoe, 1869; Symphyletes cinnamomeus Pascoe, 1859

Species of beetle

Rhytiphora cinnamomea is a species of beetle in the family Cerambycidae. It was described by Francis Polkinghorne Pascoe in 1859. It is known from Australia.
