= Corrhenes glauerti =

Scientific classification
- Domain: Eukaryota
- Kingdom: Animalia
- Phylum: Arthropoda
- Class: Insecta
- Order: Coleoptera
- Suborder: Polyphaga
- Infraorder: Cucujiformia
- Family: Cerambycidae
- Tribe: Pteropliini
- Genus: Corrhenes
- Species: C. glauerti

Binomial name
- Corrhenes glauerti McKeown, 1942

Species of beetle

Corrhenes glauerti is a species of beetle in the family Cerambycidae. It was described by McKeown in 1942. It is known from Australia.
