= Rhytiphora saundersi =

Scientific classification
- Domain: Eukaryota
- Kingdom: Animalia
- Phylum: Arthropoda
- Class: Insecta
- Order: Coleoptera
- Suborder: Polyphaga
- Infraorder: Cucujiformia
- Family: Cerambycidae
- Tribe: Pteropliini
- Genus: Rhytiphora
- Species: R. saundersi

Binomial name
- Rhytiphora saundersi Pascoe, 1857

Synonyms
- Rhytiphora blackburni Aurivillius, 1922; Penthea saundersi (Pascoe, 1857)

Species of beetle

Rhytiphora saundersi is a species of beetle in the family Cerambycidae. It was described by Francis Polkinghorne Pascoe in 1857. It is known from Australia. It contains the varietas Rhytiphora saundersi var. spenceri.
