= Rhytiphora cana =

Scientific classification
- Domain: Eukaryota
- Kingdom: Animalia
- Phylum: Arthropoda
- Class: Insecta
- Order: Coleoptera
- Suborder: Polyphaga
- Infraorder: Cucujiformia
- Family: Cerambycidae
- Tribe: Pteropliini
- Genus: Rhytiphora
- Species: R. cana

Binomial name
- Rhytiphora cana (McKeown, 1948)

Synonyms
- Platyomopsis cana McKeown, 1948

Species of beetle

Rhytiphora cana is a species of beetle in the family Cerambycidae. It was described by McKeown in 1948.
