= Rhytiphora mista =

Scientific classification
- Domain: Eukaryota
- Kingdom: Animalia
- Phylum: Arthropoda
- Class: Insecta
- Order: Coleoptera
- Suborder: Polyphaga
- Infraorder: Cucujiformia
- Family: Cerambycidae
- Tribe: Pteropliini
- Genus: Rhytiphora
- Species: R. mista

Binomial name
- Rhytiphora mista Newman, 1842

Synonyms
- Rhytiphora caprina Newman, 1842

Species of beetle

Rhytiphora mista is a species of beetle in the family Cerambycidae. It was described by Newman in 1842. It is known from Australia.
