= Rhytiphora gallus =

Scientific classification
- Domain: Eukaryota
- Kingdom: Animalia
- Phylum: Arthropoda
- Class: Insecta
- Order: Coleoptera
- Suborder: Polyphaga
- Infraorder: Cucujiformia
- Family: Cerambycidae
- Tribe: Pteropliini
- Genus: Rhytiphora
- Species: R. gallus

Binomial name
- Rhytiphora gallus (Pascoe, 1864)

Synonyms
- Symphyletes gallus Pascoe, 1864; Platyomopsis gallus (Pascoe) Aurivillius, 1922

Species of beetle

Rhytiphora gallus is a species of beetle in the family Cerambycidae. It was described by Francis Polkinghorne Pascoe in 1864. It is known from Australia.
