= Rhytiphora albospilota =

Scientific classification
- Domain: Eukaryota
- Kingdom: Animalia
- Phylum: Arthropoda
- Class: Insecta
- Order: Coleoptera
- Suborder: Polyphaga
- Infraorder: Cucujiformia
- Family: Cerambycidae
- Tribe: Pteropliini
- Genus: Rhytiphora
- Species: R. albospilota

Binomial name
- Rhytiphora albospilota Aurivillius, 1893

Synonyms
- Rhytiphora leucospila Gahan, 1893

Species of beetle

Rhytiphora albospilota is a species of beetle in the family Cerambycidae. It was described by Per Olof Christopher Aurivillius in 1893. It is known from Australia.
