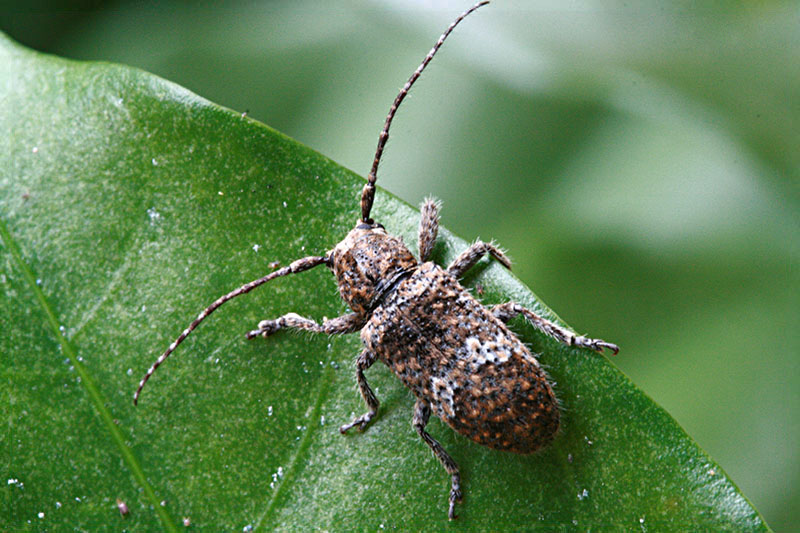

Scientific classification
- Kingdom: Animalia
- Phylum: Arthropoda
- Clade: Pancrustacea
- Class: Insecta
- Order: Coleoptera
- Suborder: Polyphaga
- Infraorder: Cucujiformia
- Family: Cerambycidae
- Genus: Rhytiphora
- Species: R. bankii

Binomial name
- Rhytiphora bankii (Fabricius, 1775)

Synonyms
- List: Prosoplus bankii (Fabricius, 1775); Prosoplus iratus (Pascoe, 1862); Acanthocinus hollandicus Boisduval in d´Urville, 1835; Aegomomus musivus Pascoe, 1864; Lamia bankii Fabricius, 1775; Micracantha nutans Sharp, 1878; Coptops abdominalis White, 1858; Nyphona insularis Pascoe, 1859; Niphona miscella Pascoe, 1863; Niphona irata Pascoe, 1862; Niphona torosa Pascoe, 1864

= Rhytiphora bankii =

Species of beetle

Rhytiphora bankii is a species of beetle in the family Cerambycidae. It was first described by Johan Christian Fabricius in 1775, under the genus Lamia. It is known from Australia, the Philippines, Borneo, Java, Micronesia, New Guinea, Hawaii, Moluccas, Sumatra, Vietnam, and has been introduced into Japan. The Australian species of Prosoplus were synonymised with Rhytiphora in 2013.

It feeds on Agave sisalana, and plants from the Apocynaceae, Asparagaceae, Asteraceae, Capparaceae, Chenopodaceae, Euphorbiaceae, Fabaceae, Malvaceae, Poaceae, and Rutaceae families.

== Some synonymies ==
Lamia bankii Fabricius, 1775 was transferred to the genus, Prosoplus, in 1961 by Stephan von Breuning, and then to the genus, Rhytiphora, by Adam Slipinski and Hermes Escalona in 2013, a change not universally accepted. (See e.g. Titan)

Coptops abdominalis White, 1858 was transferred to the genus, Prosoplus, in 1961 by Stephan von Breuning, and thence to Rhytiphora in 2013. However, in 1922 Christopher Aurivillius synonymised Coptops abdominalis with Prosoplus bankii. This synonymisation was repeated by Keith McKeown in 1947.
