= Corrhenes scenica =

Scientific classification
- Domain: Eukaryota
- Kingdom: Animalia
- Phylum: Arthropoda
- Class: Insecta
- Order: Coleoptera
- Suborder: Polyphaga
- Infraorder: Cucujiformia
- Family: Cerambycidae
- Tribe: Pteropliini
- Genus: Corrhenes
- Species: C. scenica

Binomial name
- Corrhenes scenica (Pascoe, 1863)

Species of beetle

Corrhenes scenica is a species of beetle in the family Cerambycidae. It was described by Francis Polkinghorne Pascoe in 1863.
