= Corrhenes papuana =

Scientific classification
- Kingdom: Animalia
- Phylum: Arthropoda
- Class: Insecta
- Order: Coleoptera
- Suborder: Polyphaga
- Infraorder: Cucujiformia
- Family: Cerambycidae
- Genus: Corrhenes
- Species: C. papuana

Binomial name
- Corrhenes papuana Breuning, 1959

Species of beetle

Corrhenes papuana is a species of beetle in the family Cerambycidae. It was described by Stephan von Breuning in 1959.
