= Hathliodes grammicus =

Scientific classification
- Kingdom: Animalia
- Phylum: Arthropoda
- Clade: Pancrustacea
- Class: Insecta
- Order: Coleoptera
- Suborder: Polyphaga
- Infraorder: Cucujiformia
- Family: Cerambycidae
- Genus: Hathliodes
- Species: H. grammicus

Binomial name
- Hathliodes grammicus (Pascoe, 1859)

Synonyms
- Hathlia grammica Pascoe, 1859; Rhytiphora grammica (Pascoe, 1859)

Species of beetle

Hathliodes grammicus is a species of beetle in the family Cerambycidae. It was described by Francis Polkinghorne Pascoe in 1859. It is known from Australia.
