= Rhytiphora farinosa =

Scientific classification
- Domain: Eukaryota
- Kingdom: Animalia
- Phylum: Arthropoda
- Class: Insecta
- Order: Coleoptera
- Suborder: Polyphaga
- Infraorder: Cucujiformia
- Family: Cerambycidae
- Tribe: Pteropliini
- Genus: Rhytiphora
- Species: R. farinosa

Binomial name
- Rhytiphora farinosa (Pascoe, 1863)

Synonyms
- Symphyletes farinosus Pascoe, 1863

Species of beetle

Rhytiphora farinosa is a species of beetle in the family Cerambycidae. It was described by Francis Polkinghorne Pascoe in 1863.
