= Rhytiphora regularis =

Scientific classification
- Domain: Eukaryota
- Kingdom: Animalia
- Phylum: Arthropoda
- Class: Insecta
- Order: Coleoptera
- Suborder: Polyphaga
- Infraorder: Cucujiformia
- Family: Cerambycidae
- Tribe: Pteropliini
- Genus: Rhytiphora
- Species: R. regularis

Binomial name
- Rhytiphora regularis (Gahan, 1893)

Synonyms
- Platyomopsis regularis Gahan, 1893

Species of beetle

Rhytiphora regularis is a species of beetle in the family Cerambycidae. It was described by Charles Joseph Gahan in 1893. It is known from Australia.
