= Rhytiphora obliqua =

Scientific classification
- Domain: Eukaryota
- Kingdom: Animalia
- Phylum: Arthropoda
- Class: Insecta
- Order: Coleoptera
- Suborder: Polyphaga
- Infraorder: Cucujiformia
- Family: Cerambycidae
- Tribe: Pteropliini
- Genus: Rhytiphora
- Species: R. obliqua

Binomial name
- Rhytiphora obliqua (Donovan, 1805)

Synonyms
- Platyomopsis obliqua (Donovan, 1805); Lamia obliqua Donovan, 1805

Species of beetle

Rhytiphora obliqua is a species of beetle in the family Cerambycidae. It was described by Edward Donovan in 1805. It is known from Australia.
