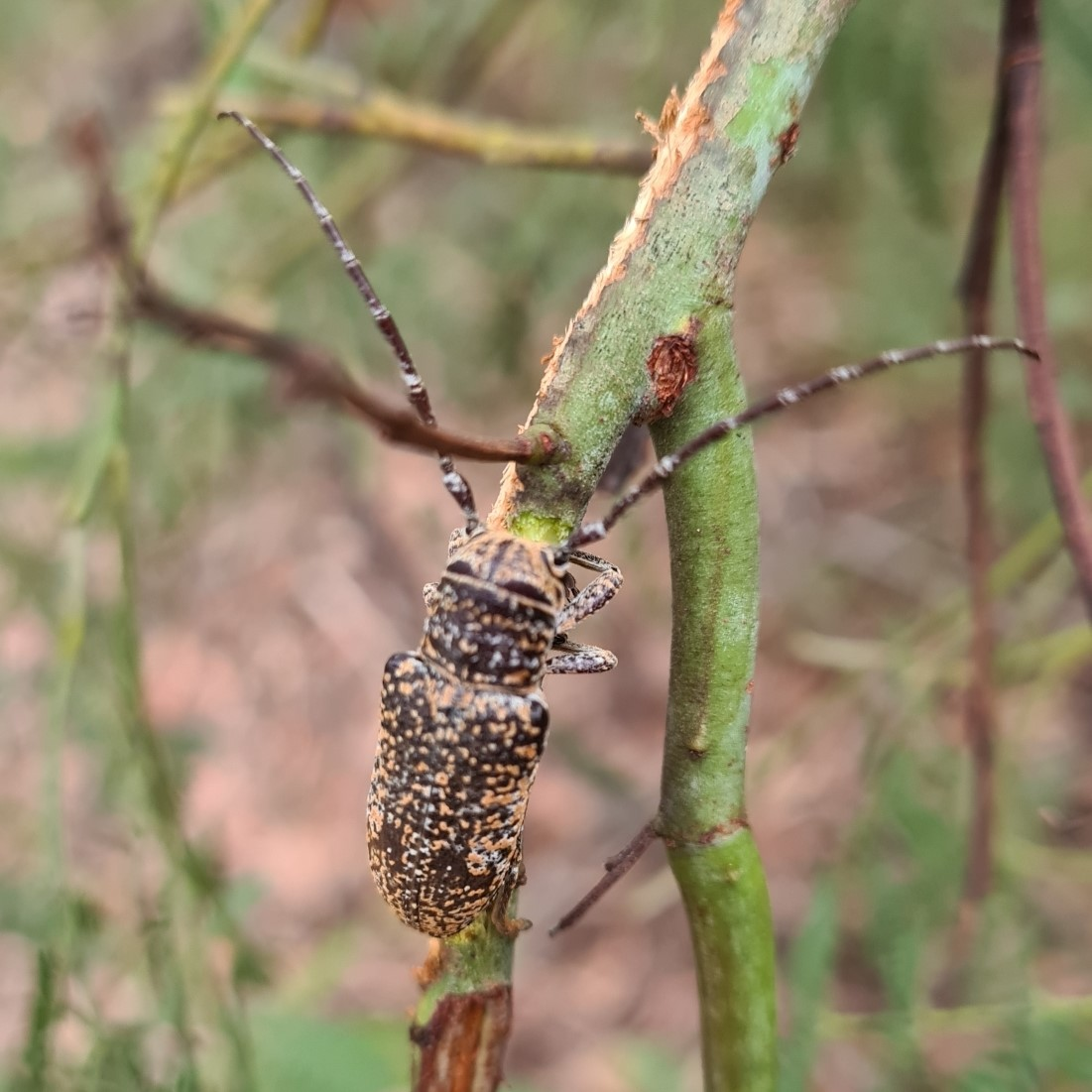

Scientific classification
- Domain: Eukaryota
- Kingdom: Animalia
- Phylum: Arthropoda
- Class: Insecta
- Order: Coleoptera
- Suborder: Polyphaga
- Infraorder: Cucujiformia
- Family: Cerambycidae
- Tribe: Pteropliini
- Genus: Rhytiphora
- Species: R. rubeta

Binomial name
- Rhytiphora rubeta Pascoe, 1863

= Rhytiphora rubeta =

Species of beetle

Rhytiphora rubeta is a species of beetle in the family Cerambycidae. It was first described by Francis Polkinghorne Pascoe in 1863 and is known from Australia.
