= Rhytiphora intertincta =

Scientific classification
- Kingdom: Animalia
- Phylum: Arthropoda
- Clade: Pancrustacea
- Class: Insecta
- Order: Coleoptera
- Suborder: Polyphaga
- Infraorder: Cucujiformia
- Family: Cerambycidae
- Genus: Rhytiphora
- Species: R. intertincta

Binomial name
- Rhytiphora intertincta Pascoe, 1867

Species of beetle

Rhytiphora intertincta is a species of beetle in the family Cerambycidae. It was described by Francis Polkinghorne Pascoe in 1867. It is known from Australia.
