= Rhytiphora rosei =

Scientific classification
- Domain: Eukaryota
- Kingdom: Animalia
- Phylum: Arthropoda
- Class: Insecta
- Order: Coleoptera
- Suborder: Polyphaga
- Infraorder: Cucujiformia
- Family: Cerambycidae
- Tribe: Pteropliini
- Genus: Rhytiphora
- Species: R. rosei

Binomial name
- Rhytiphora rosei Olliff, 1890

Species of beetle

Rhytiphora rosei is a species of beetle in the family Cerambycidae. It was described by Olliff in 1890. It is known from Australia.
