= Rhytiphora spinosa =

Scientific classification
- Domain: Eukaryota
- Kingdom: Animalia
- Phylum: Arthropoda
- Class: Insecta
- Order: Coleoptera
- Suborder: Polyphaga
- Infraorder: Cucujiformia
- Family: Cerambycidae
- Tribe: Pteropliini
- Genus: Rhytiphora
- Species: R. spinosa

Binomial name
- Rhytiphora spinosa (Thomson, 1864)

Synonyms
- Platyomopsis spinosa Thomson, 1864

Species of beetle

Rhytiphora spinosa is a species of beetle in the family Cerambycidae. It was described by James Thomson in 1864, originally under the genus Platyomopsis.
