= Rhytiphora fumata =

Scientific classification
- Domain: Eukaryota
- Kingdom: Animalia
- Phylum: Arthropoda
- Class: Insecta
- Order: Coleoptera
- Suborder: Polyphaga
- Infraorder: Cucujiformia
- Family: Cerambycidae
- Tribe: Pteropliini
- Genus: Rhytiphora
- Species: R. fumata

Binomial name
- Rhytiphora fumata (Pascoe, 1863)

Synonyms
- Symphyletes fumatus Pascoe, 1863; Platyomopsis fumata (Pascoe) MacKeown, 1947

Species of beetle

Rhytiphora fumata is a species of beetle in the family Cerambycidae. It was described by Francis Polkinghorne Pascoe in 1863. It is known from Australia.
