= Rhytiphora sannio =

Scientific classification
- Domain: Eukaryota
- Kingdom: Animalia
- Phylum: Arthropoda
- Class: Insecta
- Order: Coleoptera
- Suborder: Polyphaga
- Infraorder: Cucujiformia
- Family: Cerambycidae
- Tribe: Pteropliini
- Genus: Rhytiphora
- Species: R. sannio

Binomial name
- Rhytiphora sannio Newman, 1838

Synonyms
- Penthea sannio (Newman, 1838); Lamia sannio Newman, 1838 nec Germar, 1824

Species of beetle

Rhytiphora sannio is a species of beetle in the family Cerambycidae. It was described by Newman in 1838. It is known from Australia.
