= Corrhenes macmillani =

Scientific classification
- Domain: Eukaryota
- Kingdom: Animalia
- Phylum: Arthropoda
- Class: Insecta
- Order: Coleoptera
- Suborder: Polyphaga
- Infraorder: Cucujiformia
- Family: Cerambycidae
- Tribe: Pteropliini
- Genus: Corrhenes
- Species: C. macmillani

Binomial name
- Corrhenes macmillani Gilmour, 1950

Species of beetle

Corrhenes macmillani is a species of beetle in the family Cerambycidae. It was described by Gilmour in 1950.
