= Corrhenes undulata =

Scientific classification
- Kingdom: Animalia
- Phylum: Arthropoda
- Class: Insecta
- Order: Coleoptera
- Suborder: Polyphaga
- Infraorder: Cucujiformia
- Family: Cerambycidae
- Genus: Corrhenes
- Species: C. undulata

Binomial name
- Corrhenes undulata Breuning, 1938

Species of beetle

Corrhenes undulata is a species of beetle in the family Cerambycidae. It was described by Stephan von Breuning in 1938. It is known from Australia.
