= Rhytiphora petrorhiza =

Scientific classification
- Domain: Eukaryota
- Kingdom: Animalia
- Phylum: Arthropoda
- Class: Insecta
- Order: Coleoptera
- Suborder: Polyphaga
- Infraorder: Cucujiformia
- Family: Cerambycidae
- Tribe: Pteropliini
- Genus: Rhytiphora
- Species: R. petrorhiza

Binomial name
- Rhytiphora petrorhiza (Boisduval, 1835)

Synonyms
- Lamia petrorhiza Boisduval, 1835

Species of beetle

Rhytiphora petrorhiza is a species of beetle in the family Cerambycidae. It was described by Jean Baptiste Boisduval in 1835. It is known from Australia.
