= Mesiphiastus subtuberculatus =

Scientific classification
- Domain: Eukaryota
- Kingdom: Animalia
- Phylum: Arthropoda
- Class: Insecta
- Order: Coleoptera
- Suborder: Polyphaga
- Infraorder: Cucujiformia
- Family: Cerambycidae
- Tribe: Pteropliini
- Genus: Mesiphiastus
- Species: M. subtuberculatus

Binomial name
- Mesiphiastus subtuberculatus (White, 1858)

Synonyms
- Symphyletes subtuberculatus White, 1858; Platyomopsis subtuberculata (White) Aurivillius, 1922

Species of beetle

Mesiphiastus subtuberculatus is a species of beetle in the family Cerambycidae. It was described by White in 1858. It is known from Australia.
