= Rhytiphora lateralis =

Scientific classification
- Domain: Eukaryota
- Kingdom: Animalia
- Phylum: Arthropoda
- Class: Insecta
- Order: Coleoptera
- Suborder: Polyphaga
- Infraorder: Cucujiformia
- Family: Cerambycidae
- Tribe: Pteropliini
- Genus: Rhytiphora
- Species: R. lateralis

Binomial name
- Rhytiphora lateralis (Pascoe, 1858)

Synonyms
- Platyomopsis lateralis (Pascoe, 1858)

Species of beetle

Rhytiphora lateralis is a species of beetle in the family Cerambycidae. It was described in 1858 by Francis Polkinghorne Pascoe as Symphyletes lateralis. It is known from Australia.
