= Hathliodes costulatus =

Scientific classification
- Domain: Eukaryota
- Kingdom: Animalia
- Phylum: Arthropoda
- Class: Insecta
- Order: Coleoptera
- Suborder: Polyphaga
- Infraorder: Cucujiformia
- Family: Cerambycidae
- Tribe: Pteropliini
- Genus: Hathliodes
- Species: H. costulatus

Binomial name
- Hathliodes costulatus Pascoe, 1867

Species of beetle

Hathliodes costulatus is a species of beetle in the family Cerambycidae. It was described by Francis Polkinghorne Pascoe in 1867. It is known from Australia.
