= Corrhenes sectator =

Scientific classification
- Domain: Eukaryota
- Kingdom: Animalia
- Phylum: Arthropoda
- Class: Insecta
- Order: Coleoptera
- Suborder: Polyphaga
- Infraorder: Cucujiformia
- Family: Cerambycidae
- Tribe: Pteropliini
- Genus: Corrhenes
- Species: C. sectator

Binomial name
- Corrhenes sectator (Pascoe, 1865)

Synonyms
- Penthea sectator Pascoe, 1865

Species of beetle

Corrhenes sectator is a species of beetle in the family Cerambycidae. It was described by Francis Polkinghorne Pascoe in 1865. It is known from Australia.
