= Rhytiphora torquata =

Scientific classification
- Domain: Eukaryota
- Kingdom: Animalia
- Phylum: Arthropoda
- Class: Insecta
- Order: Coleoptera
- Suborder: Polyphaga
- Infraorder: Cucujiformia
- Family: Cerambycidae
- Tribe: Pteropliini
- Genus: Rhytiphora
- Species: R. torquata

Binomial name
- Rhytiphora torquata (Pascoe, 1875)

Synonyms
- Symphyletes torquatus Pascoe, 1875; Platyomopsis torquata (Pascoe, 1875)

Species of beetle

Rhytiphora torquata is a species of beetle in the family Cerambycidae. It was described by Francis Polkinghorne Pascoe in 1875. It is known from Australia.
