= Corrhenes =

Scientific classification
- Domain: Eukaryota
- Kingdom: Animalia
- Phylum: Arthropoda
- Class: Insecta
- Order: Coleoptera
- Suborder: Polyphaga
- Infraorder: Cucujiformia
- Family: Cerambycidae
- Tribe: Pteropliini
- Genus: Corrhenes

Genus of beetles

Corrhenes is a genus of longhorn beetles of the subfamily Lamiinae, containing the following species:

subgenus Corrhenes

- Corrhenes crassicollis (Pascoe, 1864)
- Corrhenes elongata Breuning, 1938
- Corrhenes flavovittata Breuning, 1938
- Corrhenes funebris Breuning, 1938
- Corrhenes glauerti McKeown, 1942
- Corrhenes guttulata Pascoe, 1865
- Corrhenes macmillani Gilmour, 1950
- Corrhenes mystica (Pascoe, 1863)
- Corrhenes papuana Breuning, 1959
- Corrhenes paulla (Germar, 1848)
- Corrhenes sectator (Pascoe, 1865)
- Corrhenes stigmatica (Pascoe, 1863)
- Corrhenes undulata Breuning, 1938

subgenus Fulvocorrhenes

- Corrhenes fulva Pascoe, 1875
- Corrhenes funesta (Pascoe, 1869)
- Corrhenes grisella Pascoe, 1875
- Corrhenes nigrithorax McKeown, 1942

subgenus Setocorrhenes

- Corrhenes mastersi Blackburn, 1897
- Corrhenes scenica (Pascoe, 1863)
