= Rhytiphora piligera =

Scientific classification
- Kingdom: Animalia
- Phylum: Arthropoda
- Class: Insecta
- Order: Coleoptera
- Suborder: Polyphaga
- Infraorder: Cucujiformia
- Family: Cerambycidae
- Genus: Rhytiphora
- Species: R. piligera

Binomial name
- Rhytiphora piligera (W. S. Macleay, 1826)

Synonyms
- Acanthocinus piliger MacLeay, 1826 [1]; Platyomopsis piliger (MacLeay, 1826); Probatodes piliger (MacLeay, 1826) (Ambiguous); Rhytiphora (Saperdopsis) piligera (MacLeay, 1826); Rhytiphora nodosa (Newman, 1842); Symphiletes nodosa (Newman, 1842); Symphiletes nodosus (Newman, 1842); Symphyletes nodosa Newman, 1842 [2]; Symphyletes nodosus Newman, 1842; Symphyletes piliger (MacLeay, 1826)

Species of beetle

Rhytiphora piligera is a species of beetle in the family Cerambycidae. It was described by William Sharp Macleay in 1826. It is known from Australia.
