= Rhaphiptera affinis =

Scientific classification
- Domain: Eukaryota
- Kingdom: Animalia
- Phylum: Arthropoda
- Class: Insecta
- Order: Coleoptera
- Suborder: Polyphaga
- Infraorder: Cucujiformia
- Family: Cerambycidae
- Tribe: Pteropliini
- Genus: Rhaphiptera
- Species: R. affinis

Binomial name
- Rhaphiptera affinis Thomson, 1868

Species of beetle

Rhaphiptera affinis is a species of beetle in the family Cerambycidae. It was described by James Thomson in 1868. It is known from Paraguay and Brazil.
