= Rhaphiptera scrutator =

Scientific classification
- Domain: Eukaryota
- Kingdom: Animalia
- Phylum: Arthropoda
- Class: Insecta
- Order: Coleoptera
- Suborder: Polyphaga
- Infraorder: Cucujiformia
- Family: Cerambycidae
- Tribe: Pteropliini
- Genus: Rhaphiptera
- Species: R. scrutator

Binomial name
- Rhaphiptera scrutator Thomson, 1868

Synonyms
- Pteroplia scrutator (Thomson, 1868); Pteroplius scrutator (Thomson, 1868); Rhaphiptera scrutatrix Auctt. (Missp.)

Species of beetle

Rhaphiptera scrutator is a species of beetle in the family Cerambycidae. It was described by James Thomson in 1868. It is known from Peru, Panama and French Guiana.
