= Rhaphiptera annulicornis =

Scientific classification
- Domain: Eukaryota
- Kingdom: Animalia
- Phylum: Arthropoda
- Class: Insecta
- Order: Coleoptera
- Suborder: Polyphaga
- Infraorder: Cucujiformia
- Family: Cerambycidae
- Tribe: Pteropliini
- Genus: Rhaphiptera
- Species: R. annulicornis

Binomial name
- Rhaphiptera annulicornis Gounelle, 1908

Species of beetle

Rhaphiptera annulicornis is a species of beetle in the family Cerambycidae. It was described by Gounelle in 1908. It is known from Brazil.
