= Rhaphiptera melzeri =

Scientific classification
- Domain: Eukaryota
- Kingdom: Animalia
- Phylum: Arthropoda
- Class: Insecta
- Order: Coleoptera
- Suborder: Polyphaga
- Infraorder: Cucujiformia
- Family: Cerambycidae
- Tribe: Pteropliini
- Genus: Rhaphiptera
- Species: R. melzeri

Binomial name
- Rhaphiptera melzeri Fragoso & Monné, 1984

Species of beetle

Rhaphiptera melzeri is a species of beetle in the family Cerambycidae. It was described by S. A. Fragoso and Miguel A. Monné in 1984. It is known from Brazil.
