= Rhaphiptera clarevestita =

Scientific classification
- Domain: Eukaryota
- Kingdom: Animalia
- Phylum: Arthropoda
- Class: Insecta
- Order: Coleoptera
- Suborder: Polyphaga
- Infraorder: Cucujiformia
- Family: Cerambycidae
- Tribe: Pteropliini
- Genus: Rhaphiptera
- Species: R. clarevestita

Binomial name
- Rhaphiptera clarevestita Tippmann, 1953

Synonyms
- Raphiptera gahani var. clarevestita Tippmann, 1952

Species of beetle

Rhaphiptera clarevestita is a species of beetle in the family Cerambycidae, which was described by Tippmann in 1952. It is known from Brazil.
