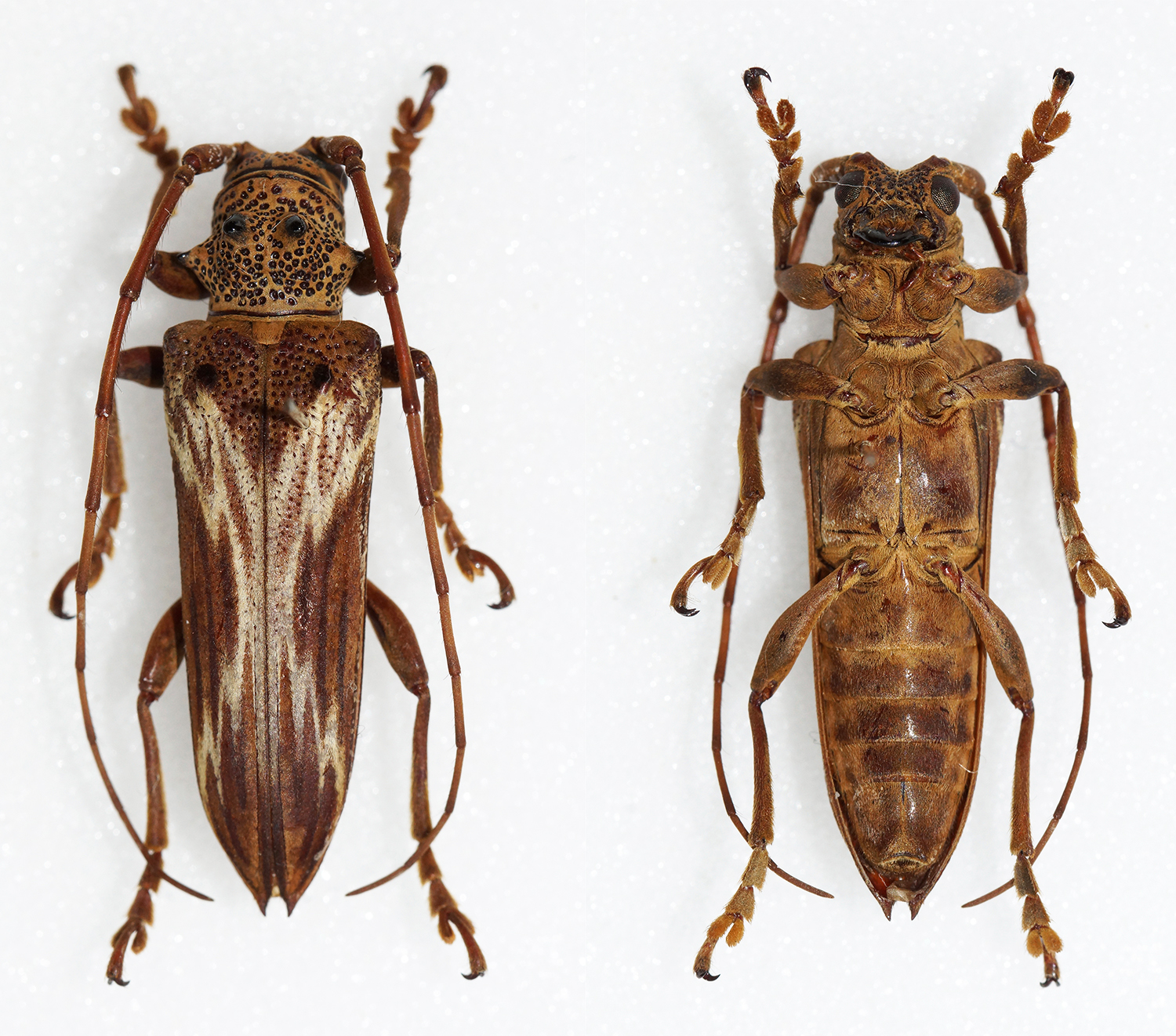
- Rhaphiptera nodifera

Scientific classification
- Domain: Eukaryota
- Kingdom: Animalia
- Phylum: Arthropoda
- Class: Insecta
- Order: Coleoptera
- Suborder: Polyphaga
- Infraorder: Cucujiformia
- Family: Cerambycidae
- Subfamily: Lamiinae
- Tribe: Pteropliini
- Genus: Rhaphiptera; Audinet-Serville, 1835

= Rhaphiptera =

Genus of beetles

Rhaphiptera is a genus of longhorn beetles of the subfamily Lamiinae, containing the following species:

- Rhaphiptera affinis Thomson, 1868
- Rhaphiptera albicans Breuning, 1940
- Rhaphiptera albipennis Breuning, 1947
- Rhaphiptera alvarengai Fragoso & Monné, 1984
- Rhaphiptera annulicornis Gounelle, 1908
- Rhaphiptera apeara Galileo & Martins, 2011
- Rhaphiptera avicenniae Dalens & Tavakilian, 2007
- Rhaphiptera boliviana Galileo & Martins, 2007
- Rhaphiptera candicans Gounelle, 1908
- Rhaphiptera clarevestita Tippmann, 1953
- Rhaphiptera durantoni Tavakilian & Touroult, 2007
- Rhaphiptera elegans Breuning, 1961
- Rhaphiptera gahani Gounelle, 1908
- Rhaphiptera lavaissierorum Dalens & Tavakilian, 2007
- Rhaphiptera melzeri Fragoso & Monné, 1984
- Rhaphiptera nodifera Audinet-Serville, 1835
- Rhaphiptera obtusipennis Melzer, 1935
- Rhaphiptera oculata Gounelle, 1908
- Rhaphiptera pallens Gounelle, 1908
- Rhaphiptera punctulata Thomson, 1868
- Rhaphiptera rixator Thomson, 1868
- Rhaphiptera roppai Fragoso & Monné, 1984
- Rhaphiptera scrutator Thomson, 1868
- Rhaphiptera seabrai Fragoso & Monné, 1984
- Rhaphiptera tavakiliani Fragoso & Monné, 1984
- Rhaphiptera triangulifera Lane, 1974
