= Rhaphiptera albicans =

Scientific classification
- Kingdom: Animalia
- Phylum: Arthropoda
- Class: Insecta
- Order: Coleoptera
- Suborder: Polyphaga
- Infraorder: Cucujiformia
- Family: Cerambycidae
- Genus: Rhaphiptera
- Species: R. albicans

Binomial name
- Rhaphiptera albicans Breuning, 1940

Species of beetle

Rhaphiptera albicans is a species of beetle in the family Cerambycidae. It was described by Stephan von Breuning in 1940. It is known from Brazil.
