= Rhaphiptera rixator =

Scientific classification
- Domain: Eukaryota
- Kingdom: Animalia
- Phylum: Arthropoda
- Class: Insecta
- Order: Coleoptera
- Suborder: Polyphaga
- Infraorder: Cucujiformia
- Family: Cerambycidae
- Tribe: Pteropliini
- Genus: Rhaphiptera
- Species: R. rixator

Binomial name
- Rhaphiptera rixator Thomson, 1868

Synonyms
- Cerambyx notatus Voet, 1781 (Unav.); Cerambyx Americanus Schönherr, 1817 (Preocc.); Rhaphiptera rixator Thomson, 1868; Pteroplius rixator (Thomson, 1868); Pteroplia vexator Thomson, 1878 (Missp.); Rhaphiptera rixatrix Auctt. (Missp.)

Species of beetle

Rhaphiptera rixator is a species of beetle in the family Cerambycidae. It was described by James Thomson in 1868. It is known from French Guiana and Brazil.
