= Rhaphiptera triangulifera =

Scientific classification
- Domain: Eukaryota
- Kingdom: Animalia
- Phylum: Arthropoda
- Class: Insecta
- Order: Coleoptera
- Suborder: Polyphaga
- Infraorder: Cucujiformia
- Family: Cerambycidae
- Tribe: Pteropliini
- Genus: Rhaphiptera
- Species: R. triangulifera

Binomial name
- Rhaphiptera triangulifera Lane, 1974

Synonyms
- Rhaphiptera triangularis Fragoso & Monné, 1984

Species of beetle

Rhaphiptera triangulifera is a species of beetle in the family Cerambycidae. It was described by Lane in 1974. It is known from Brazil.
