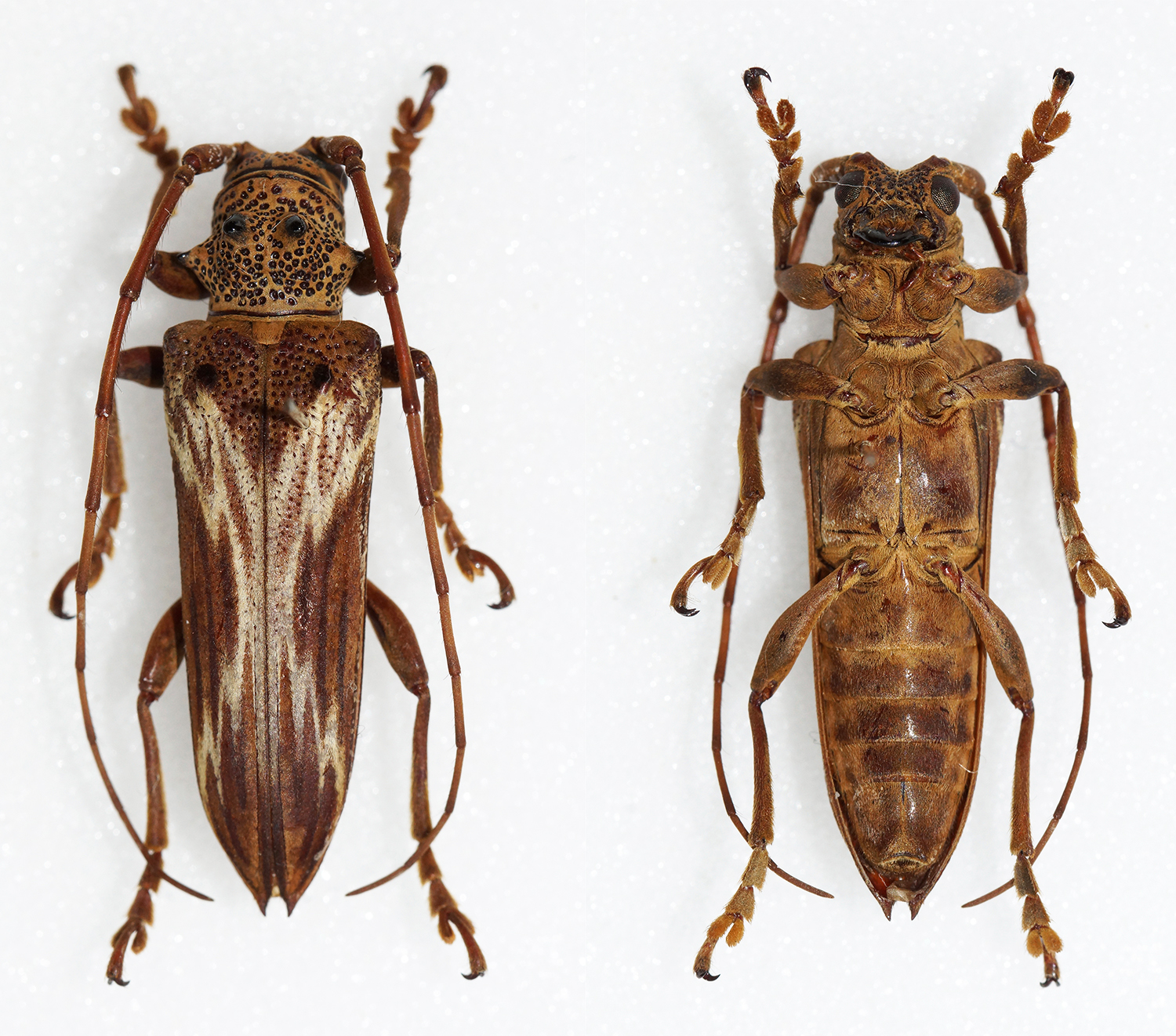

Scientific classification
- Domain: Eukaryota
- Kingdom: Animalia
- Phylum: Arthropoda
- Class: Insecta
- Order: Coleoptera
- Suborder: Polyphaga
- Infraorder: Cucujiformia
- Family: Cerambycidae
- Tribe: Pteropliini
- Genus: Rhaphiptera
- Species: R. nodifera

Binomial name
- Rhaphiptera nodifera Audinet-Serville, 1835

Synonyms
- Pteroplius nodifer Audinet-Serville, 1835; Pteroplia nodifera Thomson, 1860; Rhaphiptera nodifer Thomson, 1864

= Rhaphiptera nodifera =

Species of beetle

Rhaphiptera nodifera is a species of beetle in the family Cerambycidae. It was described by Audinet-Serville in 1835. It is known from Argentina, Paraguay and Brazil.
