= Rhaphiptera punctulata =

Scientific classification
- Domain: Eukaryota
- Kingdom: Animalia
- Phylum: Arthropoda
- Class: Insecta
- Order: Coleoptera
- Suborder: Polyphaga
- Infraorder: Cucujiformia
- Family: Cerambycidae
- Tribe: Pteropliini
- Genus: Rhaphiptera
- Species: R. punctulata

Binomial name
- Rhaphiptera punctulata Thomson, 1868

Synonyms
- Pteroplius punctulatus Gemminger & Harold, 1873; Pteroplia punctulata Thomson, 1878

Species of beetle

Rhaphiptera punctulata is a species of beetle in the family Cerambycidae. It was described by James Thomson in 1868. It is known from Brazil.
