= Rhaphiptera avicenniae =

Scientific classification
- Domain: Eukaryota
- Kingdom: Animalia
- Phylum: Arthropoda
- Class: Insecta
- Order: Coleoptera
- Suborder: Polyphaga
- Infraorder: Cucujiformia
- Family: Cerambycidae
- Tribe: Pteropliini
- Genus: Rhaphiptera
- Species: R. avicenniae

Binomial name
- Rhaphiptera avicenniae Dalens & Tavakilian, 2007

Species of beetle

Rhaphiptera avicenniae is a species of beetle in the family Cerambycidae. It was described by Dalens and Tavakilian in 2007. It is known from French Guiana and Brazil.
