= Rhaphiptera gahani =

Scientific classification
- Domain: Eukaryota
- Kingdom: Animalia
- Phylum: Arthropoda
- Class: Insecta
- Order: Coleoptera
- Suborder: Polyphaga
- Infraorder: Cucujiformia
- Family: Cerambycidae
- Tribe: Pteropliini
- Genus: Rhaphiptera
- Species: R. gahani

Binomial name
- Rhaphiptera gahani Gounelle, 1908

Synonyms
- Rhaphiptera planipennis Zajciw, 1960

Species of beetle

Rhaphiptera gahani is a species of beetle in the family Cerambycidae. It was described by Gounelle in 1908. It is known from Brazil.
