= Cyardium variegatum =

Scientific classification
- Kingdom: Animalia
- Phylum: Arthropoda
- Clade: Pancrustacea
- Class: Insecta
- Order: Coleoptera
- Suborder: Polyphaga
- Infraorder: Cucujiformia
- Family: Cerambycidae
- Genus: Cyardium
- Species: C. variegatum

Binomial name
- Cyardium variegatum Aurivillius, 1913

Species of beetle

Cyardium variegatum is a species of beetle in the family Cerambycidae. It was described by Per Olof Christopher Aurivillius in 1913. It is known from Sumatra and Borneo.
