= Cyardium obscurum =

Scientific classification
- Kingdom: Animalia
- Phylum: Arthropoda
- Clade: Pancrustacea
- Class: Insecta
- Order: Coleoptera
- Suborder: Polyphaga
- Infraorder: Cucujiformia
- Family: Cerambycidae
- Genus: Cyardium
- Species: C. obscurum

Binomial name
- Cyardium obscurum Aurivillius, 1925

Species of beetle

Cyardium obscurum is a species of beetle in the family Cerambycidae. It was described by Per Olof Christopher Aurivillius in 1925. It is known from Sumatra and Borneo.
