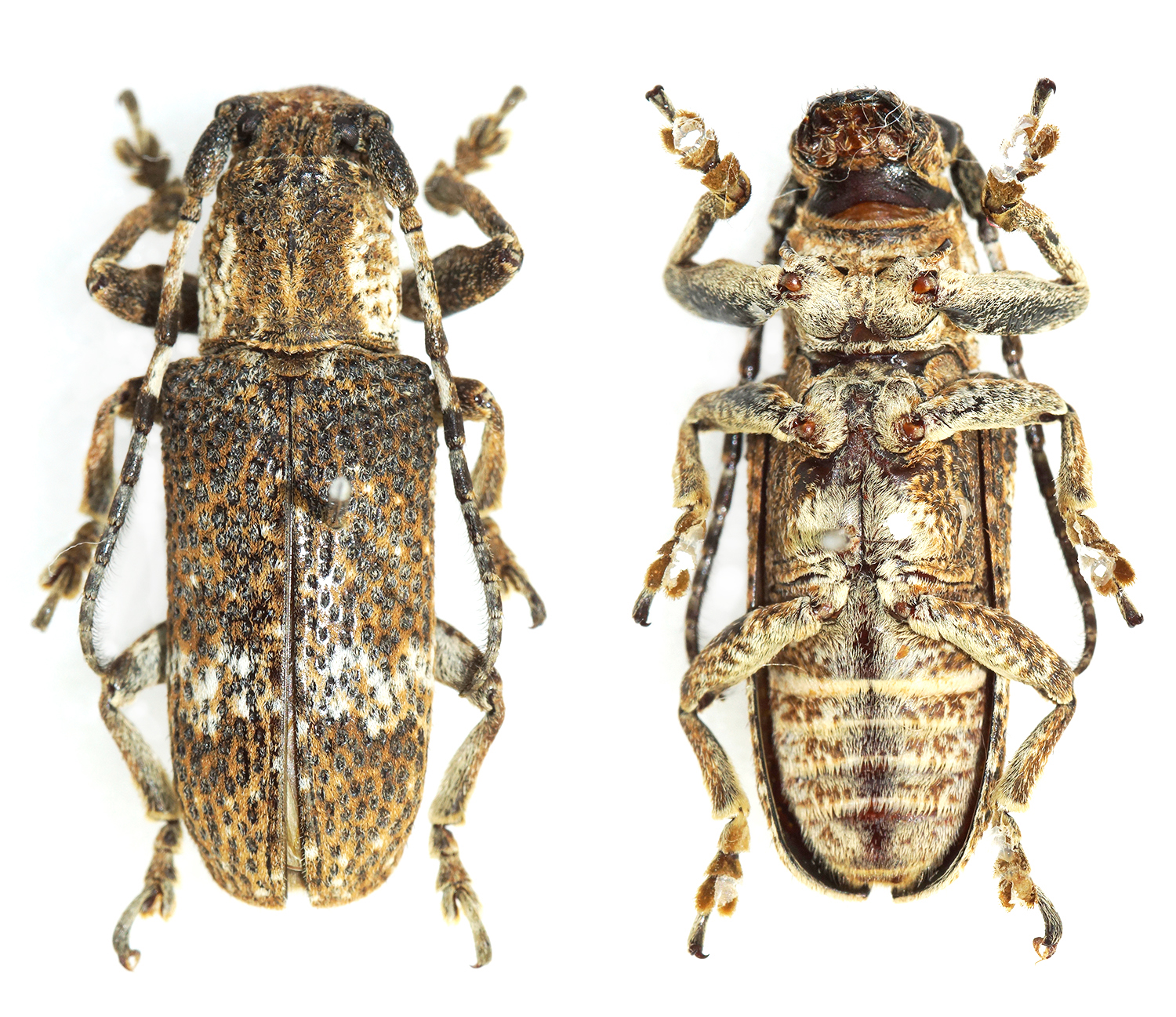

Scientific classification
- Kingdom: Animalia
- Phylum: Arthropoda
- Clade: Pancrustacea
- Class: Insecta
- Order: Coleoptera
- Suborder: Polyphaga
- Infraorder: Cucujiformia
- Family: Cerambycidae
- Genus: Cyardium
- Species: C. cribrosum

Binomial name
- Cyardium cribrosum Pascoe, 1866

= Cyardium cribrosum =

Species of beetle

Cyardium cribrosum is a species of beetle in the family Cerambycidae. It was described by Francis Polkinghorne Pascoe in 1866. It is known from Sumatra, Borneo and Malaysia.
