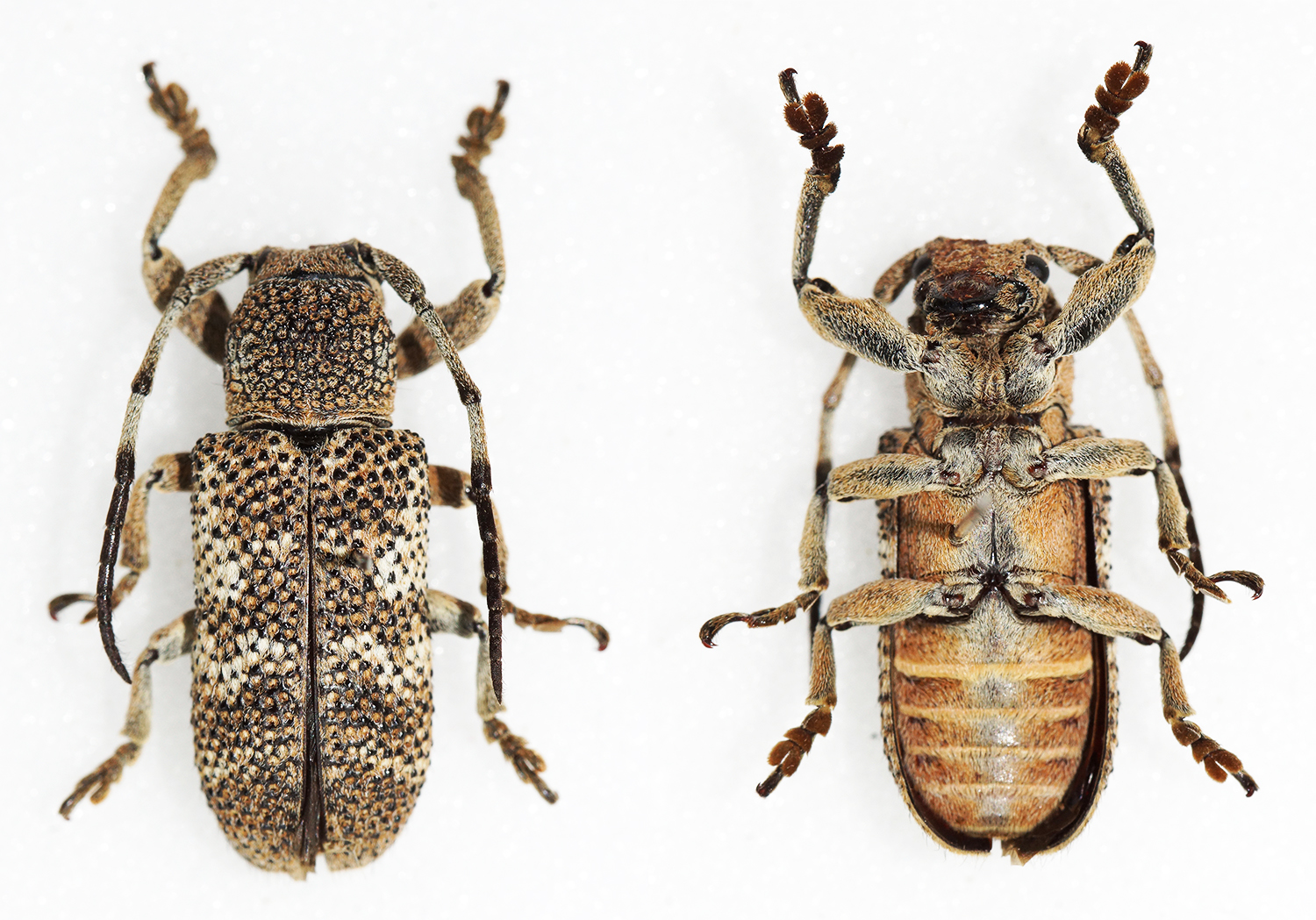
- Cyardium granulatum

Scientific classification
- Domain: Eukaryota
- Kingdom: Animalia
- Phylum: Arthropoda
- Class: Insecta
- Order: Coleoptera
- Suborder: Polyphaga
- Infraorder: Cucujiformia
- Family: Cerambycidae
- Tribe: Pteropliini
- Genus: Cyardium

= Cyardium =

Genus of beetles

Cyardium is a genus of longhorn beetles of the subfamily Lamiinae, containing the following species:

- Cyardium castelnaudii (Thomson, 1864)
- Cyardium cribrosum Pascoe, 1866
- Cyardium granulatum Breuning, 1980
- Cyardium malaccense Breuning, 1968
- Cyardium obscurum Aurivillius, 1925
- Cyardium variegatum Aurivillius, 1913
