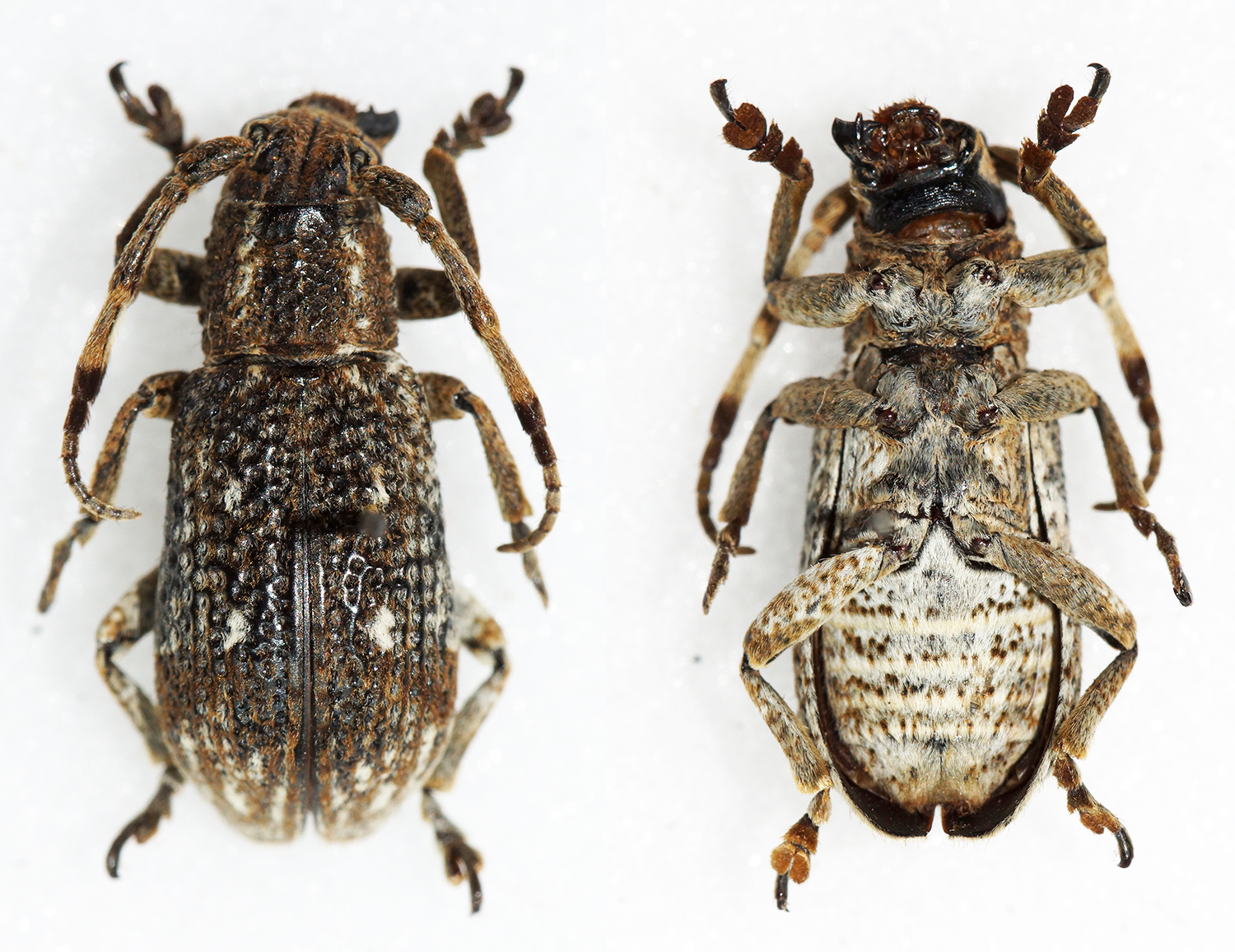

Scientific classification
- Kingdom: Animalia
- Phylum: Arthropoda
- Clade: Pancrustacea
- Class: Insecta
- Order: Coleoptera
- Suborder: Polyphaga
- Infraorder: Cucujiformia
- Family: Cerambycidae
- Genus: Cyardium
- Species: C. castelnaudii

Binomial name
- Cyardium castelnaudii (Thomson, 1864)

Synonyms
- Ixais episomoides Pascoe, 1866; Nicomia castelnaudii Thomson, 1864

= Cyardium castelnaudii =

Species of beetle

Cyardium castelnaudii is a species of beetle in the family Cerambycidae. It was described by James Thomson in 1864. It is known from Malaysia, Java, and Sumatra.
