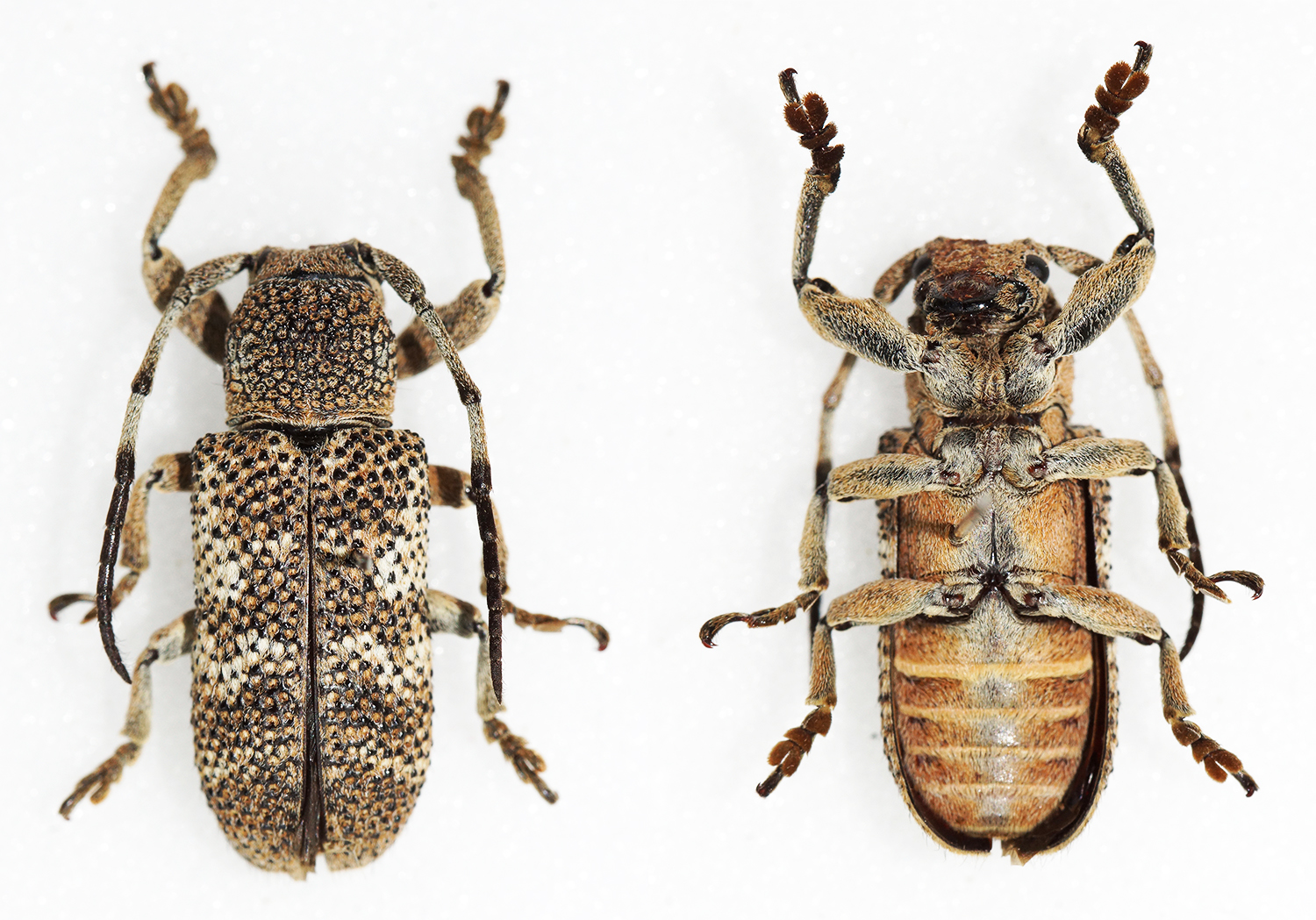

Scientific classification
- Kingdom: Animalia
- Phylum: Arthropoda
- Class: Insecta
- Order: Coleoptera
- Suborder: Polyphaga
- Infraorder: Cucujiformia
- Family: Cerambycidae
- Genus: Cyardium
- Species: C. granulatum

Binomial name
- Cyardium granulatum Breuning, 1980

= Cyardium granulatum =

Species of beetle

Cyardium granulatum is a species of beetle in the family Cerambycidae. It was described by Stephan von Breuning in 1980. It is known from the Philippines.
