= Esthlogena nigrosuturalis =

Scientific classification
- Domain: Eukaryota
- Kingdom: Animalia
- Phylum: Arthropoda
- Class: Insecta
- Order: Coleoptera
- Suborder: Polyphaga
- Infraorder: Cucujiformia
- Family: Cerambycidae
- Tribe: Pteropliini
- Genus: Esthlogena
- Species: E. nigrosuturalis

Binomial name
- Esthlogena nigrosuturalis Galileo & Martins, 2011

Species of beetle

Esthlogena nigrosuturalis is a species of beetle in the family Cerambycidae. It was described by Galileo and Martins in 2011.
