= Esthlogena proletaria =

Scientific classification
- Domain: Eukaryota
- Kingdom: Animalia
- Phylum: Arthropoda
- Class: Insecta
- Order: Coleoptera
- Suborder: Polyphaga
- Infraorder: Cucujiformia
- Family: Cerambycidae
- Tribe: Pteropliini
- Genus: Esthlogena
- Species: E. proletaria

Binomial name
- Esthlogena proletaria Thomson, 1868

Species of beetle

Esthlogena proletaria is a species of beetle in the family Cerambycidae. It was described by James Thomson in 1868. It is known from Peru and Venezuela.
