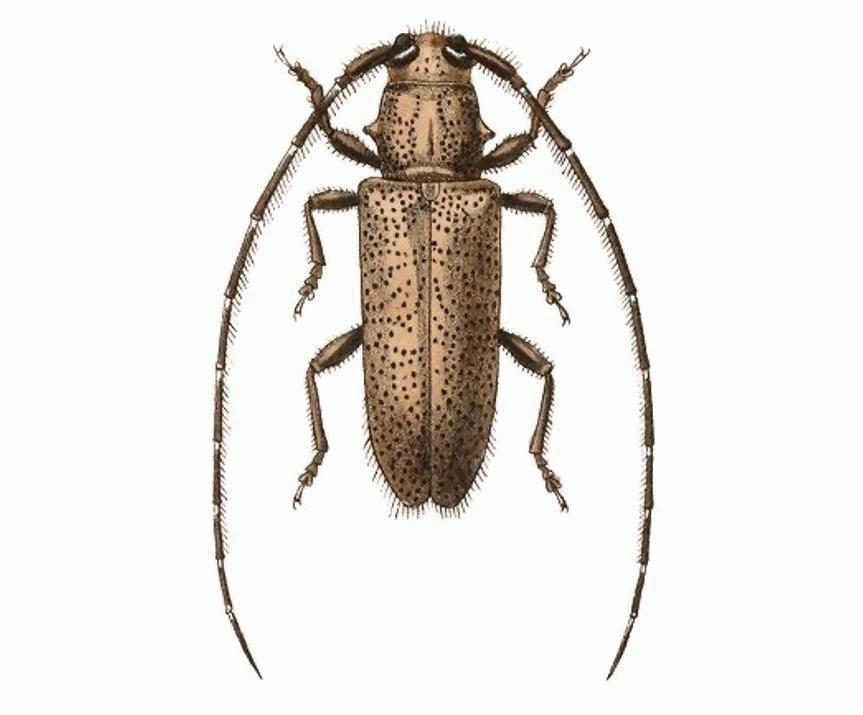

Scientific classification
- Domain: Eukaryota
- Kingdom: Animalia
- Phylum: Arthropoda
- Class: Insecta
- Order: Coleoptera
- Suborder: Polyphaga
- Infraorder: Cucujiformia
- Family: Cerambycidae
- Tribe: Pteropliini
- Genus: Esthlogena
- Species: E. porosa

Binomial name
- Esthlogena porosa Bates, 1872

= Esthlogena porosa =

Species of beetle

Esthlogena porosa is a species of beetle in the family Cerambycidae. It was described by Henry Walter Bates in 1872. It is known from Mexico, Honduras, Costa Rica, Panama, and Nicaragua.
