= Esthlogena setosa =

Scientific classification
- Domain: Eukaryota
- Kingdom: Animalia
- Phylum: Arthropoda
- Class: Insecta
- Order: Coleoptera
- Suborder: Polyphaga
- Infraorder: Cucujiformia
- Family: Cerambycidae
- Tribe: Pteropliini
- Genus: Esthlogena
- Species: E. setosa

Binomial name
- Esthlogena setosa Galileo, Bezark & Santos-Silva, 2016

Species of beetle

Esthlogena setosa is a species of longhorn beetle in the subfamily Lamiinae. It was described by Galileo, Bezark and Santos-Silva in 2016. It is known from Ecuador.

E. setosa females are between 9.8 and 12.5 mm long, including the beetle's mandibles. They measure 3.3 mm at their widest and 2.0 at their shortest. Relative to their antenna and elytra hardened frontal wings, their body is quite small. The elytra of E. setosa are between 7.3 mm and 9.3 mm long. The beetle's antenna measure up to 55% longer than the already-massive elytra. The species' name comes from its extreme hairiness and many setae. Setae close to the beetle's eyes are longer than those farther away, appearing as if eyelashes. The beetle's exoskeleton is also extremely punctate, with many small holes and dents on the frons and body. The size and density of the beetle's punctures varies based on body part.
