= Esthlogena porosoides =

Scientific classification
- Kingdom: Animalia
- Phylum: Arthropoda
- Class: Insecta
- Order: Coleoptera
- Suborder: Polyphaga
- Infraorder: Cucujiformia
- Family: Cerambycidae
- Genus: Esthlogena
- Species: E. porosoides

Binomial name
- Esthlogena porosoides Breuning, 1969

Species of beetle

Esthlogena porosoides is a species of beetle in the family Cerambycidae. It was described by Stephan von Breuning in 1969. It is known from Brazil.
