= Esthlogena albolineata =

Scientific classification
- Kingdom: Animalia
- Phylum: Arthropoda
- Class: Insecta
- Order: Coleoptera
- Suborder: Polyphaga
- Infraorder: Cucujiformia
- Family: Cerambycidae
- Genus: Esthlogena
- Species: E. albolineata

Binomial name
- Esthlogena albolineata (Breuning, 1940)

Species of beetle

Esthlogena albolineata is a species of beetle in the family Cerambycidae, which was described by Stephan von Breuning in 1940 and is known from Guyana and French Guiana.
