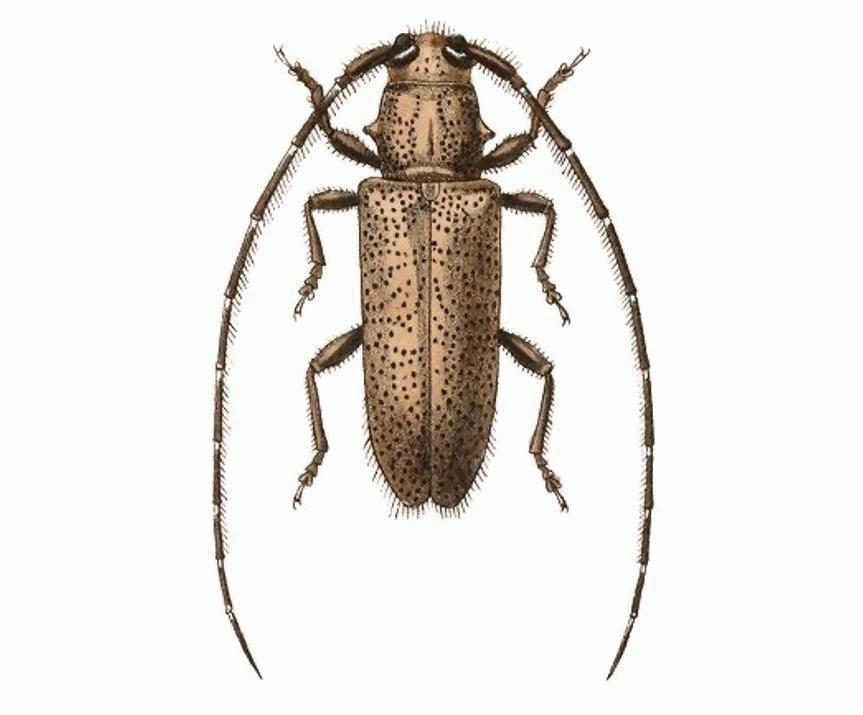
- Esthlogena porosa

Scientific classification
- Domain: Eukaryota
- Kingdom: Animalia
- Phylum: Arthropoda
- Class: Insecta
- Order: Coleoptera
- Suborder: Polyphaga
- Infraorder: Cucujiformia
- Family: Cerambycidae
- Tribe: Pteropliini
- Genus: Esthlogena; Thomson, 1864

Synonyms
- Hebestola Thomson, 1857

= Esthlogena =

Genus of beetles

Esthlogena is a genus of longhorn beetles of the subfamily Lamiinae.

== Species ==
Esthlogena contains the following species:

subgenus Esthlogena

- Esthlogena albisetosa Bates, 1880
- Esthlogena albolineata (Breuning, 1940)
- Esthlogena amaliae Galileo & Martins, 2011
- Esthlogena brunnescens Breuning, 1940
- Esthlogena chicacaoensis Galileo & Martins, 2011
- Esthlogena comata (Thomson, 1857)
- Esthlogena crassa Martins, Galileo & Santos-Silva, 2015
- Esthlogena dissimilis Galileo & Martins, 2011
- Esthlogena foveolata Aurivillius, 1920
- Esthlogena glaucipennis Thomson, 1868
- Esthlogena guatemalena Bates, 1885
- Esthlogena lanata Breuning, 1940
- Esthlogena maculifrons Thomson, 1868
- Esthlogena mirandilla Bates, 1885
- Esthlogena nigrosuturalis Galileo & Martins, 2011
- Esthlogena porosa Bates, 1872
- Esthlogena porosoides Breuning, 1969
- Esthlogena setosa Galileo, Bezark & Santos-Silva, 2016
- Esthlogena spinipennis Breuning, 1942
- Esthlogena spinosa Breuning, 1954

subgenus Pseudotaxia

- Esthlogena bella Galileo, Martins, Le Tirant & Santos-Silva, 2014
- Esthlogena obliquata Breuning, 1940
- Esthlogena proletaria Thomson, 1868
