= Esthlogena spinosa =

Scientific classification
- Kingdom: Animalia
- Phylum: Arthropoda
- Class: Insecta
- Order: Coleoptera
- Suborder: Polyphaga
- Infraorder: Cucujiformia
- Family: Cerambycidae
- Genus: Esthlogena
- Species: E. spinosa

Binomial name
- Esthlogena spinosa Breuning, 1954

Species of beetle

Esthlogena spinosa is a species of beetle in the family Cerambycidae. It was described by Stephan von Breuning in 1954. It is known from Guatemala.
