= Baraeus itzingeri =

Scientific classification
- Kingdom: Animalia
- Phylum: Arthropoda
- Class: Insecta
- Order: Coleoptera
- Suborder: Polyphaga
- Infraorder: Cucujiformia
- Family: Cerambycidae
- Genus: Baraeus
- Species: B. itzingeri

Binomial name
- Baraeus itzingeri Breuning, 1935

Species of beetle

Baraeus itzingeri is a species of beetle in the family Cerambycidae. It was described by Stephan von Breuning in 1935. It is known from Tanzania and the Democratic Republic of the Congo.
