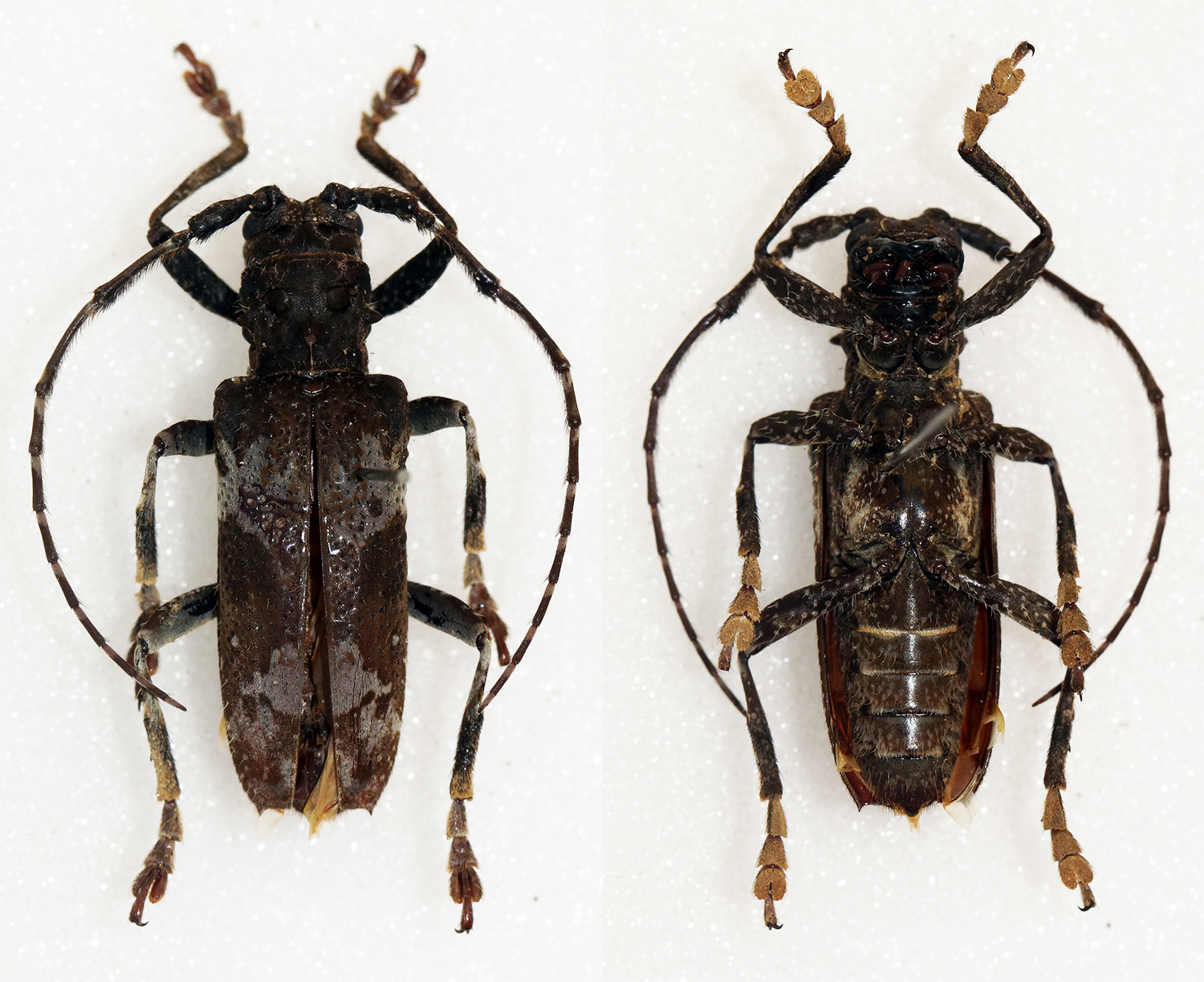

Scientific classification
- Domain: Eukaryota
- Kingdom: Animalia
- Phylum: Arthropoda
- Class: Insecta
- Order: Coleoptera
- Suborder: Polyphaga
- Infraorder: Cucujiformia
- Family: Cerambycidae
- Tribe: Pteropliini
- Genus: Baraeus
- Species: B. aurisecator

Binomial name
- Baraeus aurisecator Thomson, 1858

= Baraeus aurisecator =

Species of beetle

Baraeus aurisecator is a species of beetle in the family Cerambycidae. It was described by James Thomson in 1858. It is known from the Republic of the Congo, the Democratic Republic of the Congo, Gabon, Cameroon, and Sierra Leone.
