= Baraeus granulosus =

Scientific classification
- Kingdom: Animalia
- Phylum: Arthropoda
- Class: Insecta
- Order: Coleoptera
- Suborder: Polyphaga
- Infraorder: Cucujiformia
- Family: Cerambycidae
- Genus: Baraeus
- Species: B. granulosus

Binomial name
- Baraeus granulosus (Breuning, 1938)

Synonyms
- Baraeus albomarmoratus Breuning, 1961; Baraeus zambesianus Gilmour, 1956; Ischniopsis granulosa Breuning, 1938

Species of beetle

Baraeus granulosus is a species of beetle in the family Cerambycidae. It was described by Stephan von Breuning in 1938. It is known from Mozambique, Kenya, and Somalia.
