= Baraeus orientalis =

Scientific classification
- Domain: Eukaryota
- Kingdom: Animalia
- Phylum: Arthropoda
- Class: Insecta
- Order: Coleoptera
- Suborder: Polyphaga
- Infraorder: Cucujiformia
- Family: Cerambycidae
- Tribe: Pteropliini
- Genus: Baraeus
- Species: B. orientalis

Binomial name
- Baraeus orientalis Aurivillius, 1907

Synonyms
- Baraeus granulipennis Breuning, 1954; Emphreus ethiopicus Breuning, 1976

Species of beetle

Baraeus orientalis is a species of beetle in the family Cerambycidae. It was described by Per Olof Christopher Aurivillius in 1907. It is known from Tanzania, Malawi, Kenya, Namibia, Zimbabwe, Somalia, Cameroon, Ethiopia, and Zambia.
