= Baraeus gabonicus =

Scientific classification
- Kingdom: Animalia
- Phylum: Arthropoda
- Class: Insecta
- Order: Coleoptera
- Suborder: Polyphaga
- Infraorder: Cucujiformia
- Family: Cerambycidae
- Genus: Baraeus
- Species: B. gabonicus

Binomial name
- Baraeus gabonicus Breuning, 1961

Species of beetle

Baraeus gabonicus is a species of beetle in the family Cerambycidae. It was described by Stephan von Breuning in 1961. It is known from Gabon.
