= Baraeus subvittatus =

Scientific classification
- Kingdom: Animalia
- Phylum: Arthropoda
- Class: Insecta
- Order: Coleoptera
- Suborder: Polyphaga
- Infraorder: Cucujiformia
- Family: Cerambycidae
- Genus: Baraeus
- Species: B. subvittatus

Binomial name
- Baraeus subvittatus Breuning, 1955

Species of beetle

Baraeus subvittatus is a species of beetle in the family Cerambycidae. It was described by Stephan von Breuning in 1955. It is known from Cameroon.
