= Baraeus taeniolatus =

Scientific classification
- Domain: Eukaryota
- Kingdom: Animalia
- Phylum: Arthropoda
- Class: Insecta
- Order: Coleoptera
- Suborder: Polyphaga
- Infraorder: Cucujiformia
- Family: Cerambycidae
- Tribe: Pteropliini
- Genus: Baraeus
- Species: B. taeniolatus

Binomial name
- Baraeus taeniolatus (Chevrolat, 1857)

Synonyms
- Temnoscelis taeniolatus Chevrolat, 1857

Species of beetle

Baraeus taeniolatus is a species of beetle in the family Cerambycidae. It was described by Louis Alexandre Auguste Chevrolat in 1857. It is known from the Ivory Coast, the Democratic Republic of the Congo, Sierra Leone, the Central African Republic, Nigeria, and Togo.
