= Baraeus plagiatus =

Scientific classification
- Kingdom: Animalia
- Phylum: Arthropoda
- Class: Insecta
- Order: Coleoptera
- Suborder: Polyphaga
- Infraorder: Cucujiformia
- Family: Cerambycidae
- Genus: Baraeus
- Species: B. plagiatus

Binomial name
- Baraeus plagiatus (Hintz, 1919)

Synonyms
- Ischnia plagiata Hintz, 1919; Ischniodes mediofusca Breuning, 1940

Species of beetle

Baraeus plagiatus is a species of beetle in the family Cerambycidae. It was described by Hintz in 1919. It is known from Cameroon.
