= Baraeus =

Scientific classification
- Domain: Eukaryota
- Kingdom: Animalia
- Phylum: Arthropoda
- Class: Insecta
- Order: Coleoptera
- Suborder: Polyphaga
- Infraorder: Cucujiformia
- Family: Cerambycidae
- Tribe: Pteropliini
- Genus: Baraeus; Thomson, 1858

Genus of beetles

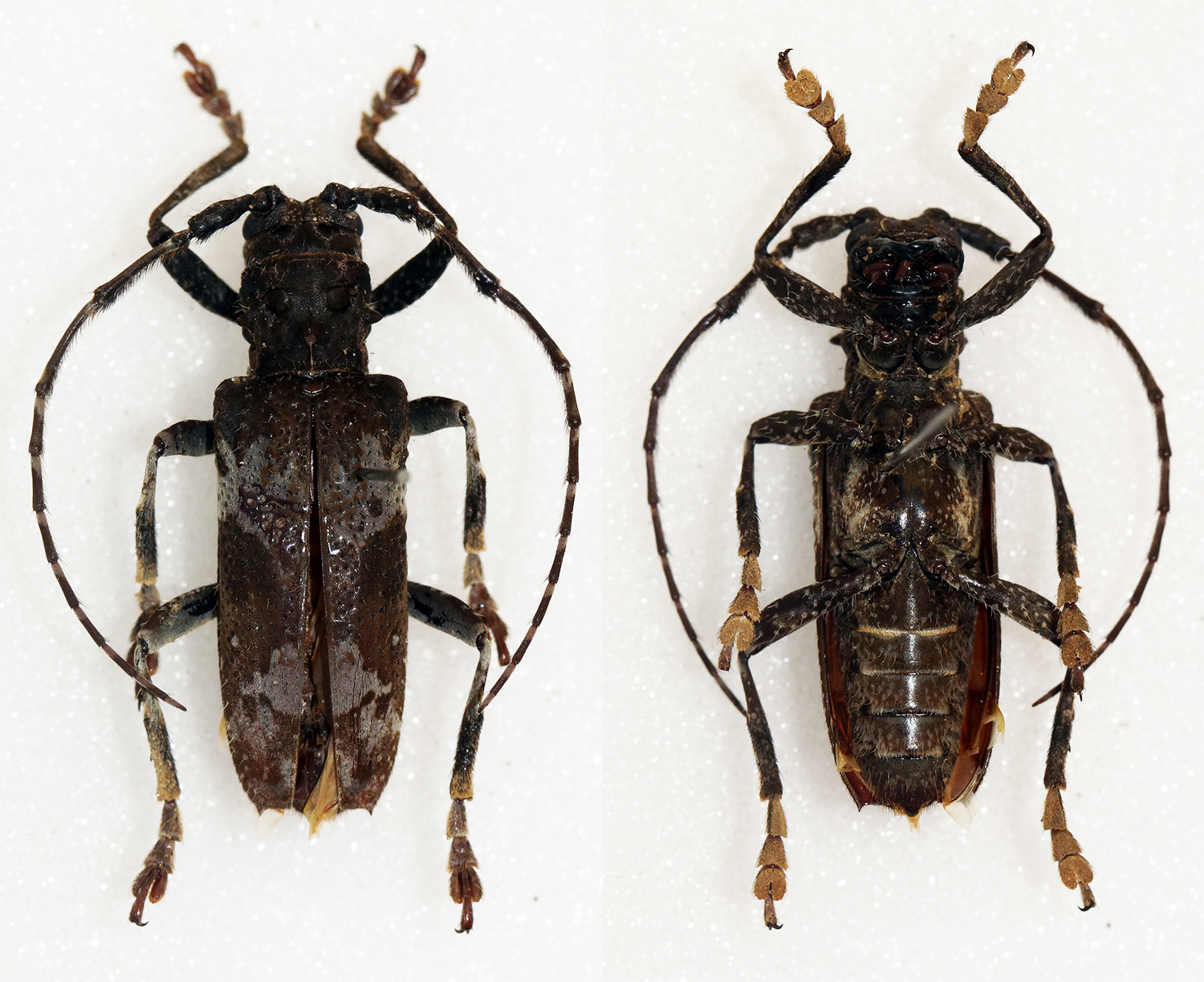
Baraeus aurisecator

Baraeus is a genus of longhorn beetles of the subfamily Lamiinae, containing the following species:

- Baraeus aurisecator Thomson, 1858
- Baraeus gabonicus Breuning, 1961
- Baraeus gracilentus Breuning, 1939
- Baraeus granulosus (Breuning, 1938)
- Baraeus itzingeri Breuning, 1935
- Baraeus orientalis Aurivillius, 1907
- Baraeus plagiatus (Hintz, 1919)
- Baraeus subvittatus Breuning, 1955
- Baraeus taeniolatus (Chevrolat, 1857)
- Baraeus tridentatus (Fabricius, 1801)
- Baraeus vittatus Aurivillius, 1913
