= Baraeus tridentatus =

Scientific classification
- Domain: Eukaryota
- Kingdom: Animalia
- Phylum: Arthropoda
- Class: Insecta
- Order: Coleoptera
- Suborder: Polyphaga
- Infraorder: Cucujiformia
- Family: Cerambycidae
- Tribe: Pteropliini
- Genus: Baraeus
- Species: B. tridentatus

Binomial name
- Baraeus tridentatus (Fabricius, 1801)

Synonyms
- Lamia tridentata Fabricius, 1801; Temnoscelis biemarginata Chevrolat, 1856

Species of beetle

Baraeus tridentatus is a species of beetle in the family Cerambycidae. It was described by Johan Christian Fabricius in 1801. It is known from Nigeria, the Ivory Coast, the Democratic Republic of the Congo, Cameroon, and Togo.
