= Baraeus vittatus =

Scientific classification
- Domain: Eukaryota
- Kingdom: Animalia
- Phylum: Arthropoda
- Class: Insecta
- Order: Coleoptera
- Suborder: Polyphaga
- Infraorder: Cucujiformia
- Family: Cerambycidae
- Tribe: Pteropliini
- Genus: Baraeus
- Species: B. vittatus

Binomial name
- Baraeus vittatus Aurivillius, 1913

Species of beetle

Baraeus vittatus is a species of beetle in the family Cerambycidae. It was described by Per Olof Christopher Aurivillius in 1913 and is known from the Democratic Republic of the Congo and Cameroon.
