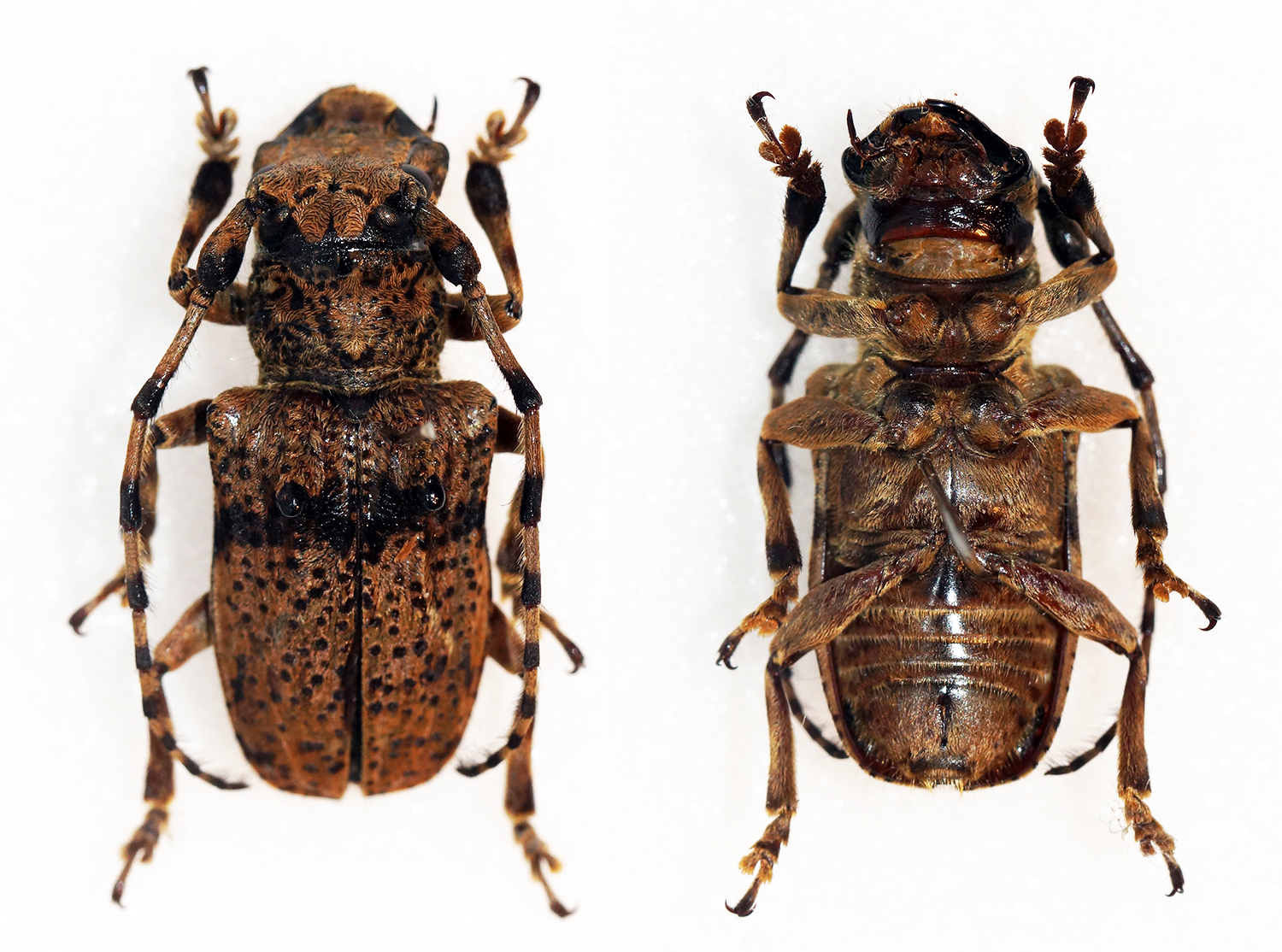

Scientific classification
- Kingdom: Animalia
- Phylum: Arthropoda
- Class: Insecta
- Order: Coleoptera
- Suborder: Polyphaga
- Infraorder: Cucujiformia
- Family: Cerambycidae
- Genus: Daxata
- Species: D. sumatrensis

Binomial name
- Daxata sumatrensis Breuning, 1961

= Daxata sumatrensis =

Species of beetle

Daxata sumatrensis is a species of beetle in the family Cerambycidae. It was described by Stephan von Breuning in 1961. It is known from Sumatra.
