= Daxata confusa =

Scientific classification
- Kingdom: Animalia
- Phylum: Arthropoda
- Class: Insecta
- Order: Coleoptera
- Suborder: Polyphaga
- Infraorder: Cucujiformia
- Family: Cerambycidae
- Genus: Daxata
- Species: D. confusa

Binomial name
- Daxata confusa Pascoe, 1869

Species of beetle

Daxata confusa is a species of beetle in the family Cerambycidae. It was described by Francis Polkinghorne Pascoe in 1869. It is known from Malaysia, Borneo and Java.
