= Daxata ustulata =

Scientific classification
- Kingdom: Animalia
- Phylum: Arthropoda
- Clade: Pancrustacea
- Class: Insecta
- Order: Coleoptera
- Suborder: Polyphaga
- Infraorder: Cucujiformia
- Family: Cerambycidae
- Genus: Daxata
- Species: D. ustulata

Binomial name
- Daxata ustulata Pascoe, 1866

Species of beetle

Daxata ustulata is a species of beetle in the family Cerambycidae. It was described by Francis Polkinghorne Pascoe in 1866. It is known from Thailand, Borneo, Sumatra and Malaysia.
