= Daxata anterufipennis =

Scientific classification
- Kingdom: Animalia
- Phylum: Arthropoda
- Class: Insecta
- Order: Coleoptera
- Suborder: Polyphaga
- Infraorder: Cucujiformia
- Family: Cerambycidae
- Genus: Daxata
- Species: D. anterufipennis

Binomial name
- Daxata anterufipennis Breuning, 1961

Species of beetle

Daxata anterufipennis is a species of beetle in the family Cerambycidae. It was described by Stephan von Breuning in 1961.
