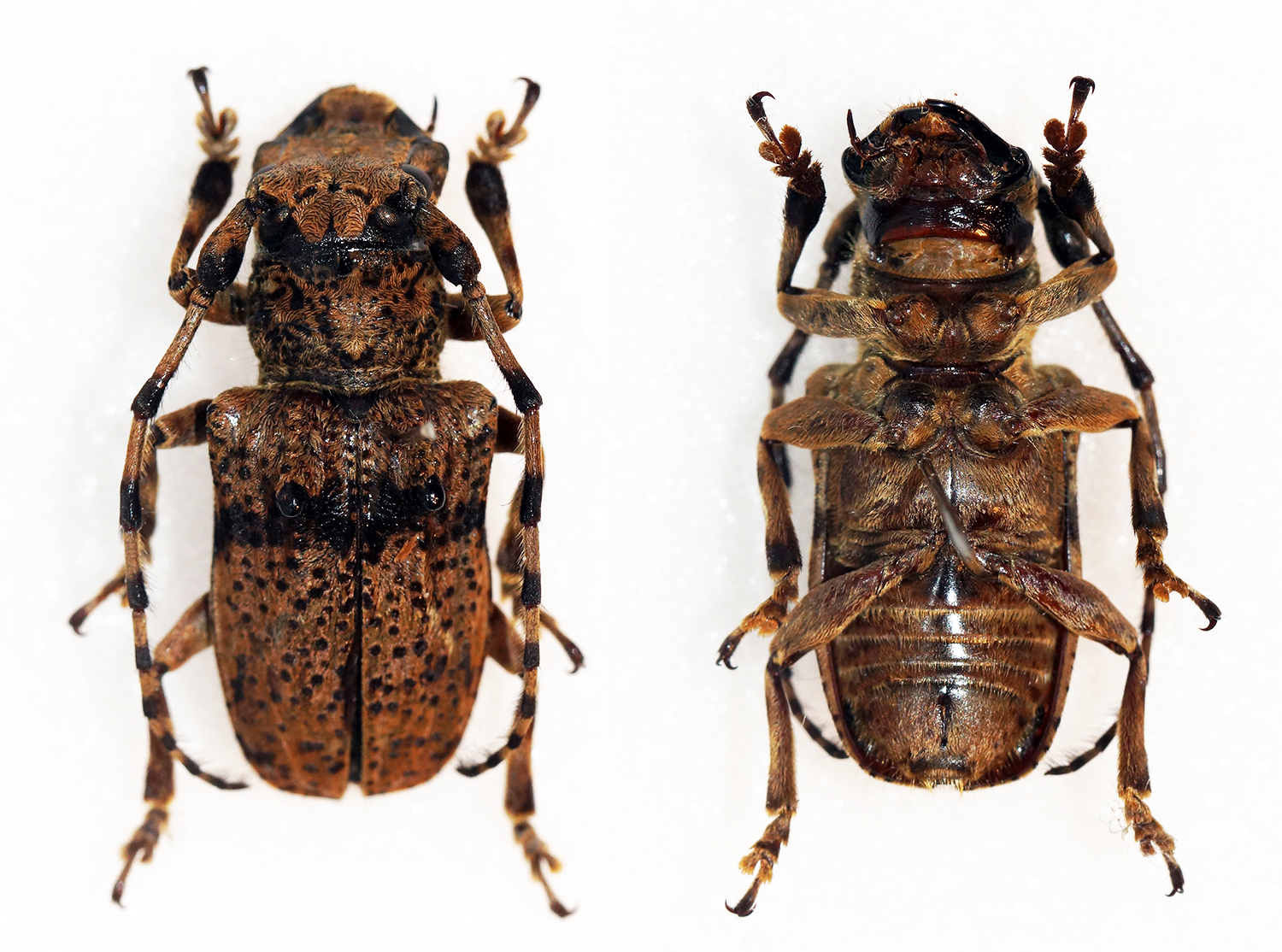
- Daxata sumatrensis

Scientific classification
- Domain: Eukaryota
- Kingdom: Animalia
- Phylum: Arthropoda
- Class: Insecta
- Order: Coleoptera
- Suborder: Polyphaga
- Infraorder: Cucujiformia
- Family: Cerambycidae
- Tribe: Pteropliini
- Genus: Daxata

= Daxata =

Genus of beetles:

Daxata is a genus of longhorn beetles of the subfamily Lamiinae, containing the following species:

subgenus Daxata

- Daxata camelus Pascoe, 1864

subgenus Laodaxata

- Daxata lepesmei Breuning, 1961

subgenus Taxada

- Daxata anterufipennis Breuning, 1961
- Daxata confusa Pascoe, 1869
- Daxata laosensis Breuning, 1938
- Daxata sumatrensis Breuning, 1961
- Daxata ustulata Pascoe, 1866
