= Daxata camelus =

Scientific classification
- Kingdom: Animalia
- Phylum: Arthropoda
- Clade: Pancrustacea
- Class: Insecta
- Order: Coleoptera
- Suborder: Polyphaga
- Infraorder: Cucujiformia
- Family: Cerambycidae
- Genus: Daxata
- Species: D. camelus

Binomial name
- Daxata camelus Pascoe, 1864

Species of beetle

Daxata camelus is a species of beetle in the family Cerambycidae. It was described by Francis Polkinghorne Pascoe in 1864. It is known from Malaysia and Borneo.
