= Xiphotheata moellendorfi =

Scientific classification
- Domain: Eukaryota
- Kingdom: Animalia
- Phylum: Arthropoda
- Class: Insecta
- Order: Coleoptera
- Suborder: Polyphaga
- Infraorder: Cucujiformia
- Family: Cerambycidae
- Tribe: Pteropliini
- Genus: Xiphotheata
- Species: X. moellendorfi

Binomial name
- Xiphotheata moellendorfi (Flach, 1890)

Synonyms
- Xiphotheata moellendorfi (Flach, 1890); Ischioplites (Bubalotragus) moellendorfii Flach, 1890

Species of beetle

Xiphotheata moellendorfi is a species of beetle in the family Cerambycidae. It was described by Flach in 1890. It is known from Papua New Guinea and Indonesia.

== Varietas ==
- Xiphotheata moellendorfii var. papuana Kriesche, 1924
- Xiphotheata moellendorfii var. laevicollis Aurivillius, 1924
