= Xiphotheata luctifera =

Scientific classification
- Kingdom: Animalia
- Phylum: Arthropoda
- Class: Insecta
- Order: Coleoptera
- Suborder: Polyphaga
- Infraorder: Cucujiformia
- Family: Cerambycidae
- Genus: Xiphotheata
- Species: X. luctifera

Binomial name
- Xiphotheata luctifera Fairmaire, 1881

Species of beetle

Xiphotheata luctifera is a species of beetle in the family Cerambycidae. It was described by Léon Fairmaire in 1881. It is known from Papua New Guinea.
