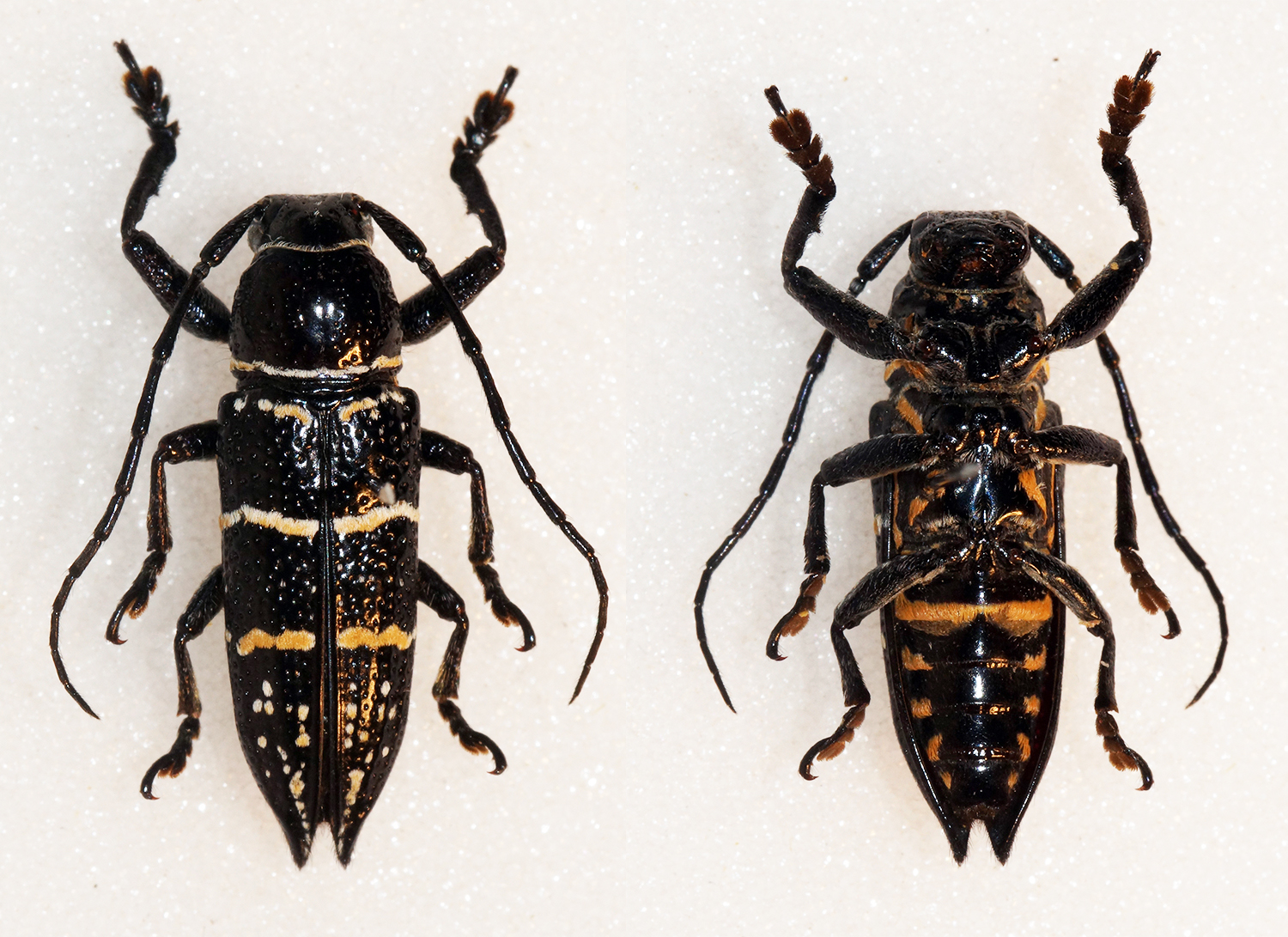
- Xiphotheota saundersi

Scientific classification
- Domain: Eukaryota
- Kingdom: Animalia
- Phylum: Arthropoda
- Class: Insecta
- Order: Coleoptera
- Suborder: Polyphaga
- Infraorder: Cucujiformia
- Family: Cerambycidae
- Tribe: Pteropliini
- Genus: Xiphotheata

= Xiphotheata =

Genus of beetles

Xiphotheata is a genus of longhorn beetles of the subfamily Lamiinae, containing the following species:

- Xiphotheata luctifera Fairmaire, 1881
- Xiphotheata moellendorfi (Flach, 1890)
- Xiphotheata saundersii Pascoe, 1864
