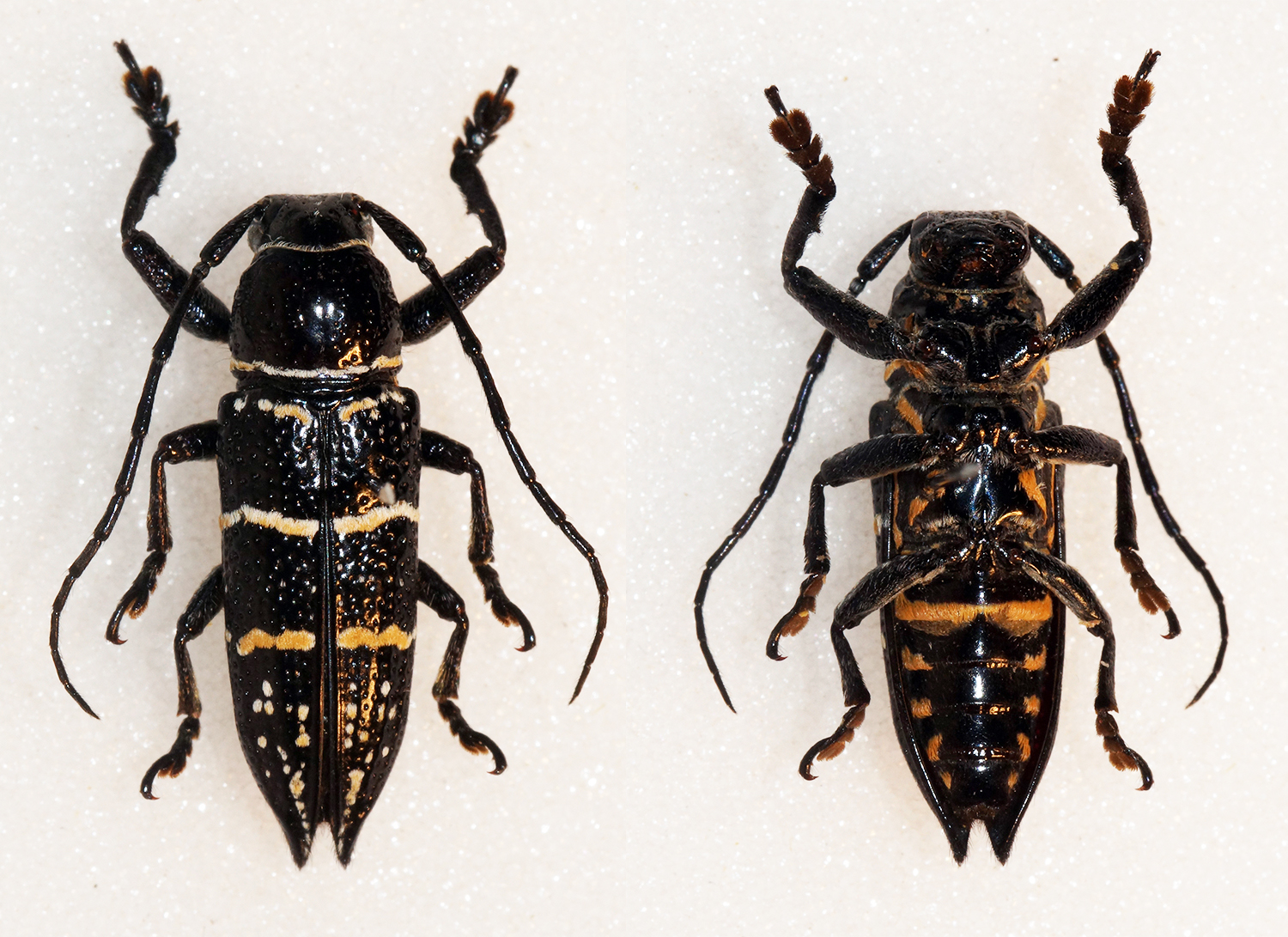
- Sex: Male. Size: 16mm

Scientific classification
- Kingdom: Animalia
- Phylum: Arthropoda
- Class: Insecta
- Order: Coleoptera
- Suborder: Polyphaga
- Infraorder: Cucujiformia
- Family: Cerambycidae
- Genus: Xiphotheata
- Species: X. saundersii

Binomial name
- Xiphotheata saundersii Pascoe, 1864

Synonyms
- Xiphotheata saundersi Pascoe, 1864

= Xiphotheata saundersii =

Species of beetle

Xiphotheata saundersii is a species of beetle in the family Cerambycidae, and the type species of its genus. It was described by Francis Polkinghorne Pascoe in 1864. It is known from Moluccas.
