= Pseudaprophata albomaculata =

Scientific classification
- Kingdom: Animalia
- Phylum: Arthropoda
- Class: Insecta
- Order: Coleoptera
- Suborder: Polyphaga
- Infraorder: Cucujiformia
- Family: Cerambycidae
- Genus: Pseudaprophata
- Species: P. albomaculata

Binomial name
- Pseudaprophata albomaculata Hüdepohl, 1995

Species of beetle

Pseudaprophata albomaculata is a species of beetle in the family Cerambycidae. It was described by Karl-Ernst Hüdepohl in 1995.
