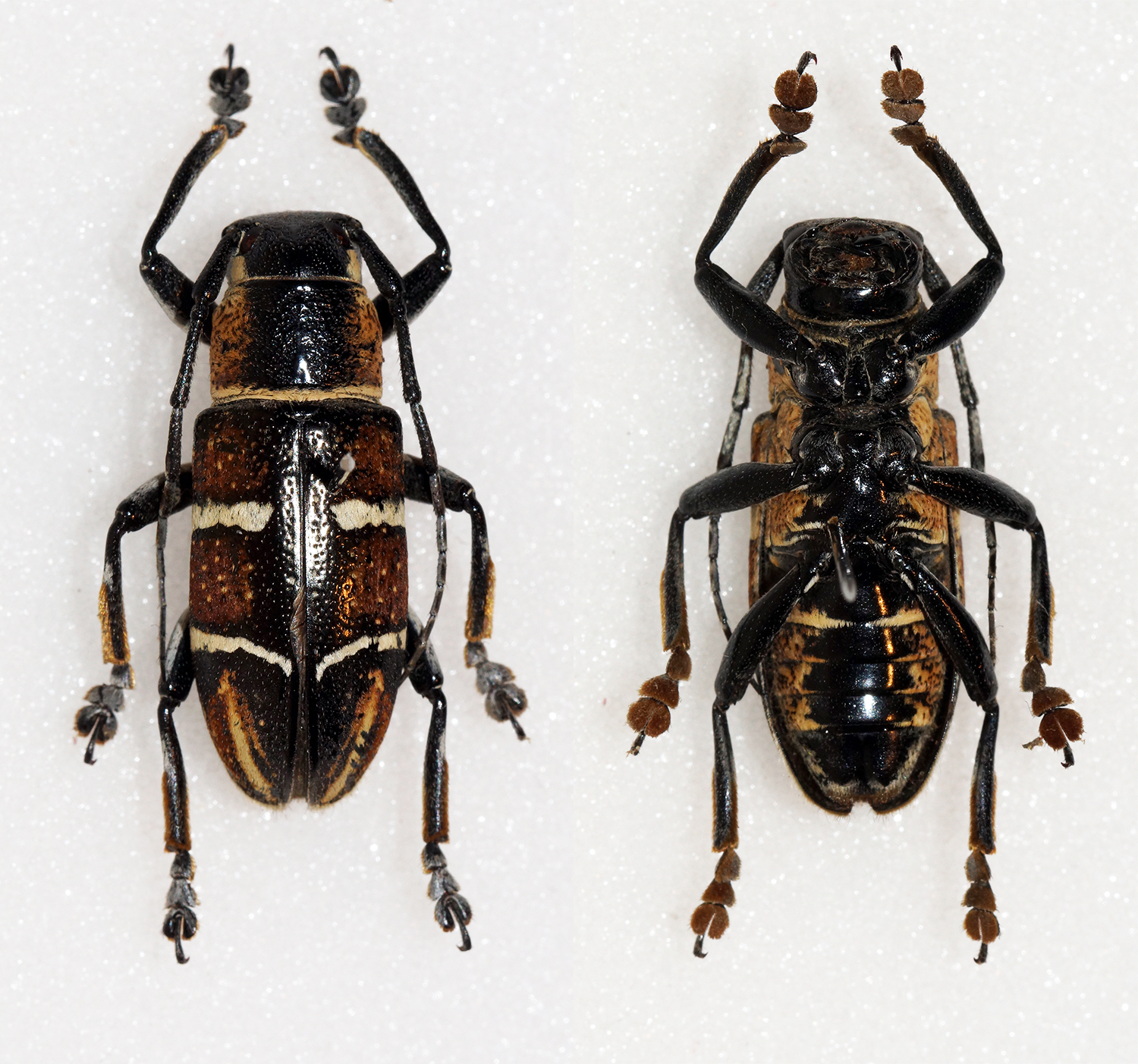

Scientific classification
- Kingdom: Animalia
- Phylum: Arthropoda
- Class: Insecta
- Order: Coleoptera
- Suborder: Polyphaga
- Infraorder: Cucujiformia
- Family: Cerambycidae
- Tribe: Pteropliini
- Genus: Pseudaprophata

= Pseudaprophata =

Genus of beetles

Pseudaprophata is a genus of longhorn beetles of the subfamily Lamiinae, containing the following species:

- Pseudaprophata albomaculata Hüdepohl, 1995
- Pseudaprophata newmanni (Westwood, 1863)
- Pseudaprophata puncticornis (Heller, 1924)
