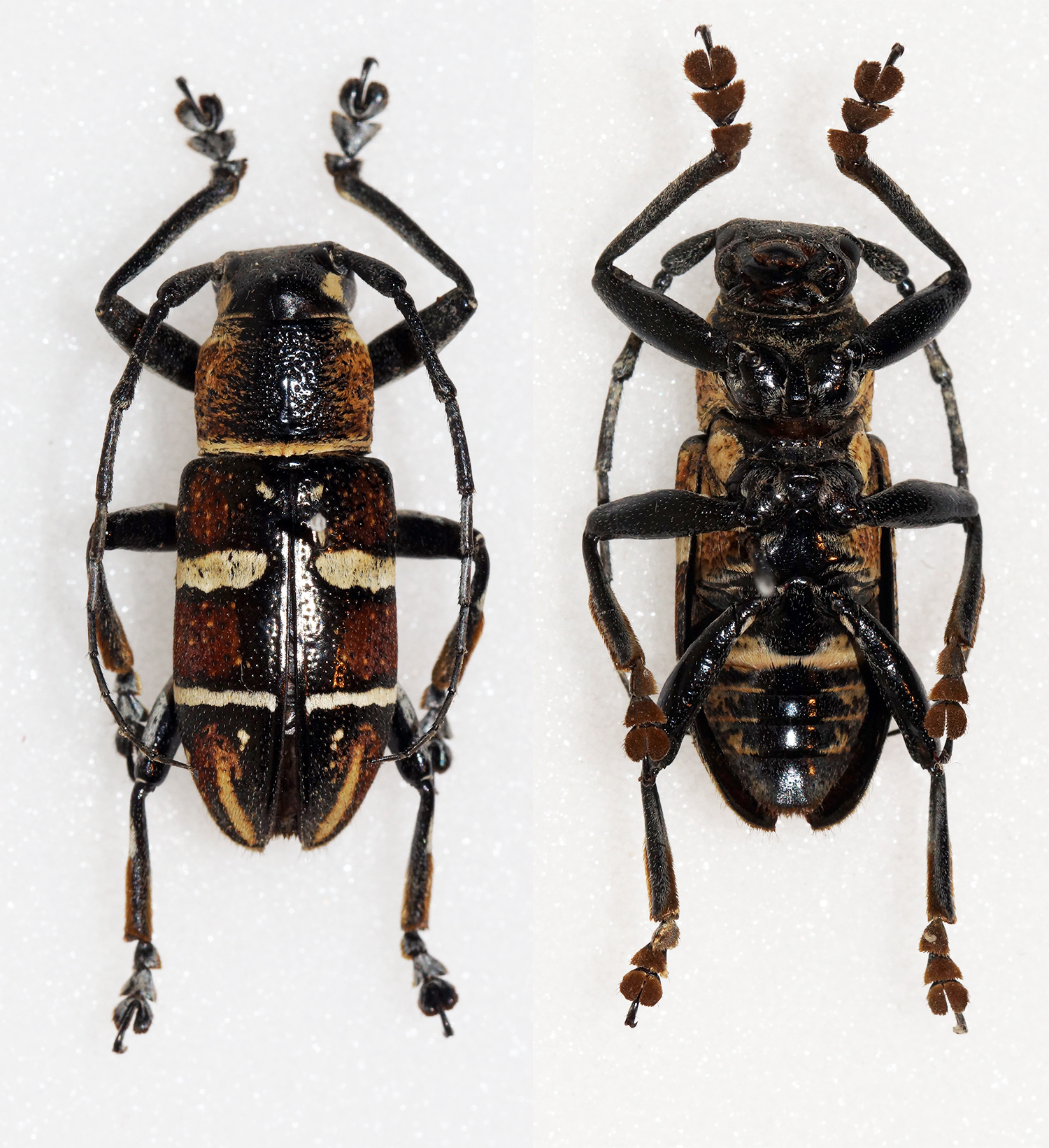
- Pseudaprophata puncticornis negrosiana

Scientific classification
- Kingdom: Animalia
- Phylum: Arthropoda
- Class: Insecta
- Order: Coleoptera
- Suborder: Polyphaga
- Infraorder: Cucujiformia
- Family: Cerambycidae
- Genus: Pseudaprophata
- Species: P. puncticornis

Binomial name
- Pseudaprophata puncticornis (Heller, 1924)

= Pseudaprophata puncticornis =

Species of beetle

Pseudaprophata puncticornis is a species of beetle in the family Cerambycidae. It was described by Heller in 1924. It is known from the Philippines.

== Subspecies ==
- Pseudaprophata puncticornis negrosiana Hüdepohl, 1987
- Pseudaprophata puncticornis puncticornis (Heller, 1924)
- Pseudaprophata puncticornis romblonica Hüdepohl, 1987
