= Pseudaprophata newmanni =

Scientific classification
- Kingdom: Animalia
- Phylum: Arthropoda
- Class: Insecta
- Order: Coleoptera
- Suborder: Polyphaga
- Infraorder: Cucujiformia
- Family: Cerambycidae
- Genus: Pseudaprophata
- Species: P. newmanni

Binomial name
- Pseudaprophata newmanni (Westwood, 1863)

Synonyms
- Abryna newmanni Westwood, 1863

Species of beetle

Pseudaprophata newmanni is a species of beetle in the family Cerambycidae. It was described by John O. Westwood in 1863. It is known from the Philippines.
