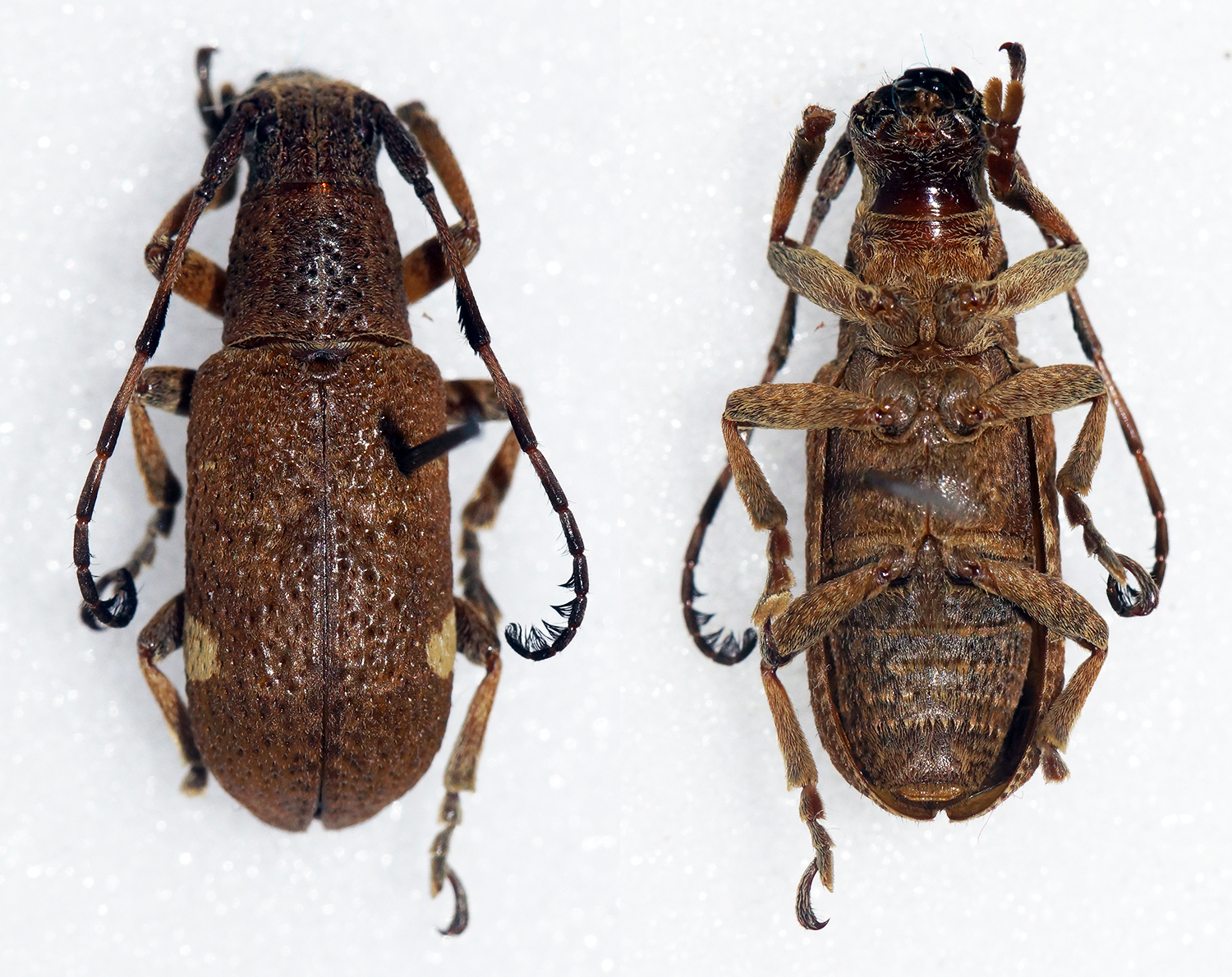

Scientific classification
- Kingdom: Animalia
- Phylum: Arthropoda
- Class: Insecta
- Order: Coleoptera
- Suborder: Polyphaga
- Infraorder: Cucujiformia
- Family: Cerambycidae
- Genus: Metagnoma
- Species: M. singularis

Binomial name
- Metagnoma singularis Aurivillius, 1925

= Metagnoma singularis =

Species of beetle

Metagnoma singularis is a species of beetle in the family Cerambycidae. It was described by Per Olof Christopher Aurivillius in 1925. It is known from Borneo.
