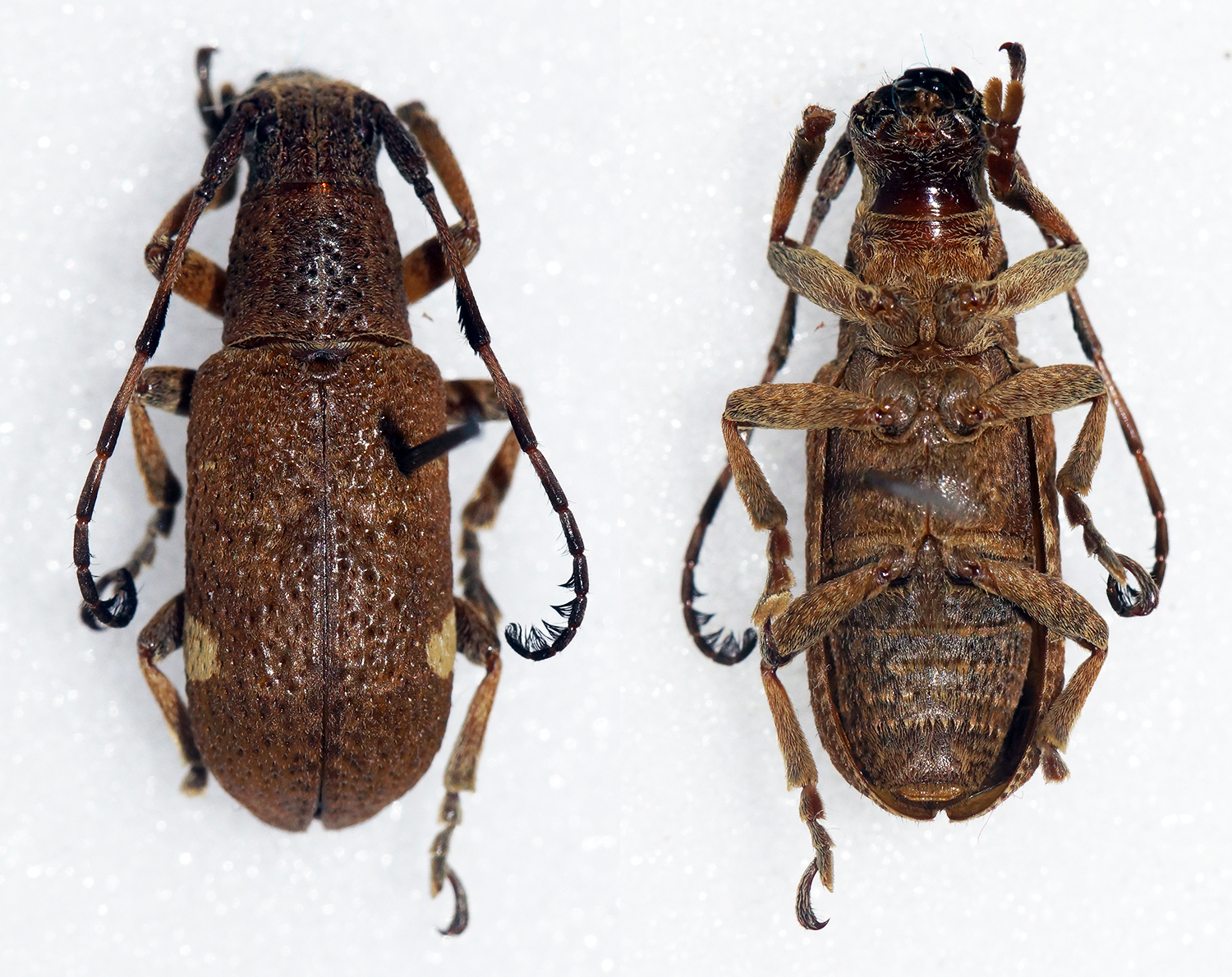
- Size: 14mm

Scientific classification
- Domain: Eukaryota
- Kingdom: Animalia
- Phylum: Arthropoda
- Class: Insecta
- Order: Coleoptera
- Suborder: Polyphaga
- Infraorder: Cucujiformia
- Family: Cerambycidae
- Tribe: Pteropliini
- Genus: Metagnoma

= Metagnoma =

Genus of beetles

Metagnoma is a genus of longhorn beetles of the subfamily Lamiinae, containing the following species:

- Metagnoma singularis Aurivillius, 1925
- Metagnoma strandi Breuning, 1943
