= Epopea subacuta =

Scientific classification
- Kingdom: Animalia
- Phylum: Arthropoda
- Class: Insecta
- Order: Coleoptera
- Suborder: Polyphaga
- Infraorder: Cucujiformia
- Family: Cerambycidae
- Genus: Epopea
- Species: E. subacuta

Binomial name
- Epopea subacuta Breuning, 1952

Species of beetle

Epopea subacuta is a species of beetle in the family Cerambycidae. It was described by Stephan von Breuning in 1952.

== Subspecies ==
- Epopea subacuta leleupi Breuning, 1975
- Epopea subacuta subacuta Breuning, 1952
