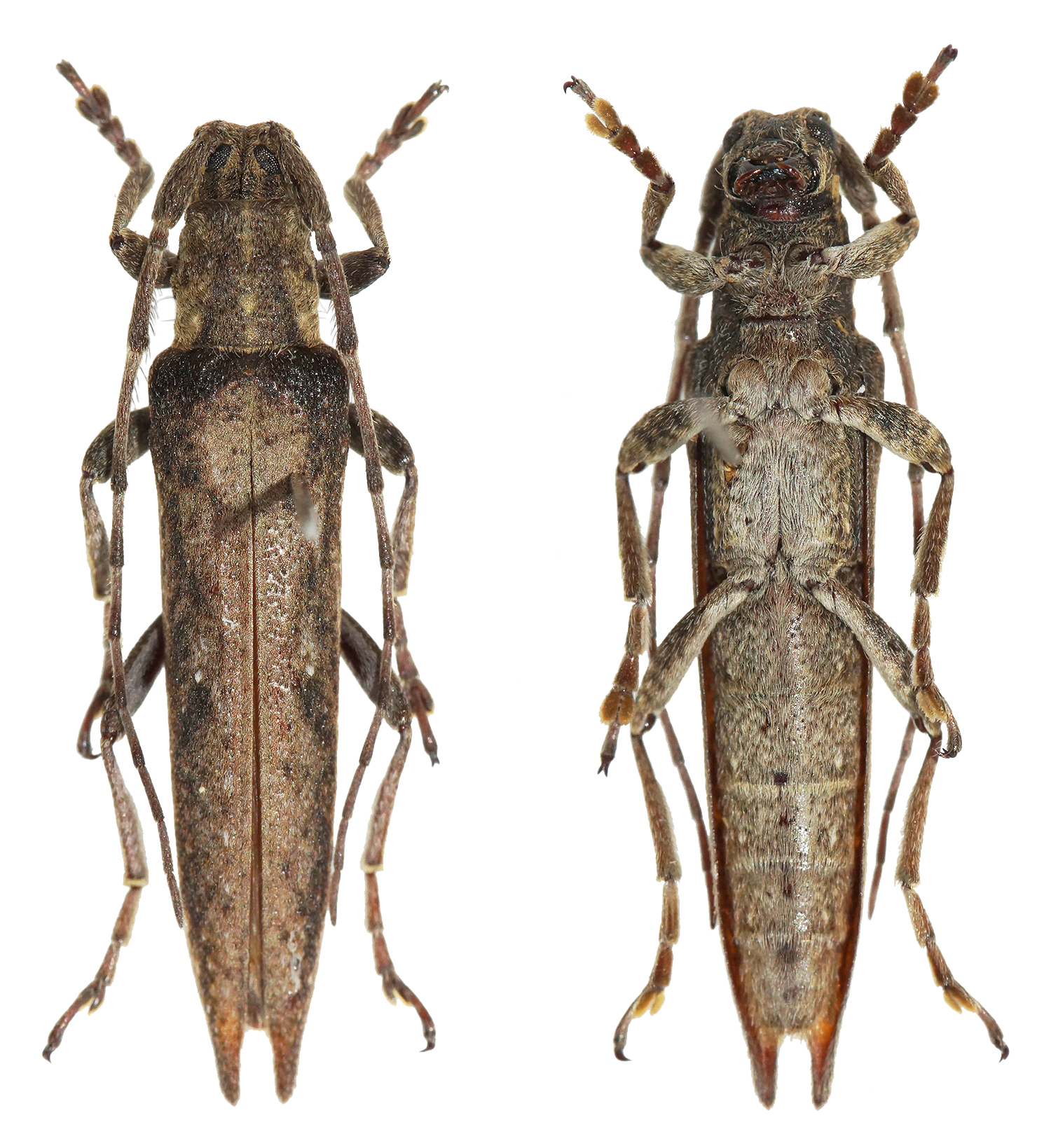

Scientific classification
- Domain: Eukaryota
- Kingdom: Animalia
- Phylum: Arthropoda
- Class: Insecta
- Order: Coleoptera
- Suborder: Polyphaga
- Infraorder: Cucujiformia
- Family: Cerambycidae
- Tribe: Pteropliini
- Genus: Epopea
- Species: E. acuta

Binomial name
- Epopea acuta Thomson, 1864

Synonyms
- Epopea acuta acuta Thomson, 1864

= Epopea acuta =

Species of beetle

Epopea acuta is a species of beetle in the family Cerambycidae. It was described by James Thomson in 1864.
