= Epopea =

Scientific classification
- Domain: Eukaryota
- Kingdom: Animalia
- Phylum: Arthropoda
- Class: Insecta
- Order: Coleoptera
- Suborder: Polyphaga
- Infraorder: Cucujiformia
- Family: Cerambycidae
- Tribe: Pteropliini
- Genus: Epopea

Genus of beetles

Epopea is a genus of longhorn beetles of the subfamily Lamiinae, containing the following species:

- Epopea acuta Thomson, 1864
- Epopea lignosa Breuning, 1940
- Epopea orientalis Breuning, 1940
- Epopea subacuta Breuning, 1952
