= Cubilia smithi =

Scientific classification
- Domain: Eukaryota
- Kingdom: Animalia
- Phylum: Arthropoda
- Class: Insecta
- Order: Coleoptera
- Suborder: Polyphaga
- Infraorder: Cucujiformia
- Family: Cerambycidae
- Tribe: Pteropliini
- Genus: Cubilia
- Species: C. smithi

Binomial name
- Cubilia smithi Jordan, 1897

Species of beetle

Cubilia smithi is a species of beetle in the family Cerambycidae. It was described by Karl Jordan in 1897.
