= Cubilia albosetosa =

Scientific classification
- Kingdom: Animalia
- Phylum: Arthropoda
- Class: Insecta
- Order: Coleoptera
- Suborder: Polyphaga
- Infraorder: Cucujiformia
- Family: Cerambycidae
- Genus: Cubilia
- Species: C. albosetosa

Binomial name
- Cubilia albosetosa Breuning, 1976

Species of beetle

Cubilia albosetosa is a species of beetle in the family Cerambycidae. It was described by Stephan von Breuning in 1976.
