= Cubilia =

Scientific classification
- Domain: Eukaryota
- Kingdom: Animalia
- Phylum: Arthropoda
- Class: Insecta
- Order: Coleoptera
- Suborder: Polyphaga
- Infraorder: Cucujiformia
- Family: Cerambycidae
- Tribe: Pteropliini
- Genus: Cubilia; Jordan, 1897

Genus of beetles

Cubilia is a genus of longhorn beetles of the subfamily Lamiinae, containing the following species:

- Cubilia albosetosa Breuning, 1976
- Cubilia eichelbaumi (Aurivillius, 1910)
- Cubilia fulva Jordan, 1903
- Cubilia heathi Jordan, 1903
- Cubilia nigricans Aurivillius, 1927
- Cubilia obscura Aurivillius, 1925
- Cubilia rufipennis Breuning, 1955
- Cubilia smithi Jordan, 1897
