= Cubilia obscura =

Scientific classification
- Domain: Eukaryota
- Kingdom: Animalia
- Phylum: Arthropoda
- Class: Insecta
- Order: Coleoptera
- Suborder: Polyphaga
- Infraorder: Cucujiformia
- Family: Cerambycidae
- Tribe: Pteropliini
- Genus: Cubilia
- Species: C. obscura

Binomial name
- Cubilia obscura Aurivillius, 1925

Species of beetle

Cubilia obscura is a species of beetle in the family Cerambycidae. It was described by Per Olof Christopher Aurivillius in 1925.
