= Cubilia heathi =

Scientific classification
- Domain: Eukaryota
- Kingdom: Animalia
- Phylum: Arthropoda
- Class: Insecta
- Order: Coleoptera
- Suborder: Polyphaga
- Infraorder: Cucujiformia
- Family: Cerambycidae
- Tribe: Pteropliini
- Genus: Cubilia
- Species: C. heathi

Binomial name
- Cubilia heathi Jordan, 1903

Species of beetle

Cubilia heathi is a species of beetle in the family Cerambycidae. It was described by Karl Jordan in 1903.
