= Cubilia rufipennis =

Scientific classification
- Kingdom: Animalia
- Phylum: Arthropoda
- Class: Insecta
- Order: Coleoptera
- Suborder: Polyphaga
- Infraorder: Cucujiformia
- Family: Cerambycidae
- Genus: Cubilia
- Species: C. rufipennis

Binomial name
- Cubilia rufipennis Breuning, 1955

Species of beetle

Cubilia rufipennis is a species of beetle in the family Cerambycidae. It was described by Stephan von Breuning in 1955.
