= Cobria albisparsa =

Scientific classification
- Domain: Eukaryota
- Kingdom: Animalia
- Phylum: Arthropoda
- Class: Insecta
- Order: Coleoptera
- Suborder: Polyphaga
- Infraorder: Cucujiformia
- Family: Cerambycidae
- Tribe: Pteropliini
- Genus: Cobria
- Species: C. albisparsa

Binomial name
- Cobria albisparsa Pascoe, 1865

Synonyms
- Cyardiopsis setifera Breuning, 1938; Rhytiphora albisparsa (Pascoe, 1865)

Species of beetle

Cobria albisparsa is a species of beetle in the family Cerambycidae. It was described by Francis Polkinghorne Pascoe in 1865. It is known from Papua New Guinea.
