= Cobria =

Scientific classification
- Domain: Eukaryota
- Kingdom: Animalia
- Phylum: Arthropoda
- Class: Insecta
- Order: Coleoptera
- Suborder: Polyphaga
- Infraorder: Cucujiformia
- Family: Cerambycidae
- Tribe: Pteropliini
- Genus: Cobria

Genus of beetles

Cobria is a genus of longhorn beetles of the subfamily Lamiinae, containing the following species:

- Cobria albisparsa Pascoe, 1865
- Cobria biroi Breuning, 1953
- Cobria fuscostictica Breuning, 1970
- Cobria rufa Breuning, 1961
- Cobria transversevittata Breuning, 1979
