= Cobria biroi =

Scientific classification
- Kingdom: Animalia
- Phylum: Arthropoda
- Clade: Pancrustacea
- Class: Insecta
- Order: Coleoptera
- Suborder: Polyphaga
- Infraorder: Cucujiformia
- Family: Cerambycidae
- Genus: Cobria
- Species: C. biroi

Binomial name
- Cobria biroi Breuning, 1953

Species of beetle

Cobria biroi is a species of beetle in the family Cerambycidae. Stephan von Breuning described it in 1953. It is known from Papua New Guinea.
