= Synixais sumatrensis =

Scientific classification
- Kingdom: Animalia
- Phylum: Arthropoda
- Class: Insecta
- Order: Coleoptera
- Suborder: Polyphaga
- Infraorder: Cucujiformia
- Family: Cerambycidae
- Genus: Synixais
- Species: S. sumatrensis

Binomial name
- Synixais sumatrensis Breuning, 1982

Species of beetle

Synixais sumatrensis is a species of beetle in the family Cerambycidae. It was described by Stephan von Breuning in 1982. It is known from Laos.
