= Synixais fuscomaculata =

Scientific classification
- Kingdom: Animalia
- Phylum: Arthropoda
- Class: Insecta
- Order: Coleoptera
- Suborder: Polyphaga
- Infraorder: Cucujiformia
- Family: Cerambycidae
- Genus: Synixais
- Species: S. fuscomaculata

Binomial name
- Synixais fuscomaculata Aurivillius, 1911

Species of beetle

Synixais fuscomaculata is a species of beetle in the family Cerambycidae. It was described by Per Olof Christopher Aurivillius in 1911. It is known from Borneo.
