= Synixais =

Scientific classification
- Kingdom: Animalia
- Phylum: Arthropoda
- Class: Insecta
- Order: Coleoptera
- Suborder: Polyphaga
- Infraorder: Cucujiformia
- Family: Cerambycidae
- Subfamily: Lamiinae
- Tribe: Pteropliini
- Genus: Synixais; Aurivillius, 1911

Genus of beetles

Synixais is a genus of longhorn beetles of the subfamily Lamiinae, containing the following species:

- Synixais banksi Breuning, 1938
- Synixais fuscomaculata Aurivillius, 1911
- Synixais notaticollis Breuning, 1964
- Synixais strandi Breuning, 1940
- Synixais sumatrensis Breuning, 1982
