= Paradaxata alboplagiata =

Scientific classification
- Kingdom: Animalia
- Phylum: Arthropoda
- Class: Insecta
- Order: Coleoptera
- Suborder: Polyphaga
- Infraorder: Cucujiformia
- Family: Cerambycidae
- Genus: Paradaxata
- Species: P. alboplagiata

Binomial name
- Paradaxata alboplagiata Breuning, 1938

Species of beetle

Paradaxata alboplagiata is a species of beetle in the family Cerambycidae. It was described by Stephan von Breuning in 1938.
