= Mispilodes =

Scientific classification
- Kingdom: Animalia
- Phylum: Arthropoda
- Class: Insecta
- Order: Coleoptera
- Suborder: Polyphaga
- Infraorder: Cucujiformia
- Family: Cerambycidae
- Tribe: Pteropliini
- Genus: Mispilodes

Genus of beetles

Mispilodes is a genus of longhorn beetles of the subfamily Lamiinae, containing the following species:

- Mispilodes andamanica Breuning, 1969
- Mispilodes borneensis Breuning, 1938
- Mispilodes grisescens Breuning, 1940
