= Esthlogenopsis atlantica =

Scientific classification
- Domain: Eukaryota
- Kingdom: Animalia
- Phylum: Arthropoda
- Class: Insecta
- Order: Coleoptera
- Suborder: Polyphaga
- Infraorder: Cucujiformia
- Family: Cerambycidae
- Tribe: Pteropliini
- Genus: Esthlogenopsis
- Species: E. atlantica

Binomial name
- Esthlogenopsis atlantica Monne & Monne, 2006

Species of beetle

Esthlogenopsis atlantica is a species of beetle in the family Cerambycidae. It was described by Monne and Monne in 2006. It is known from Brazil.
