= Esthlogenopsis ochreoscutellaris =

Scientific classification
- Kingdom: Animalia
- Phylum: Arthropoda
- Class: Insecta
- Order: Coleoptera
- Suborder: Polyphaga
- Infraorder: Cucujiformia
- Family: Cerambycidae
- Genus: Esthlogenopsis
- Species: E. ochreoscutellaris

Binomial name
- Esthlogenopsis ochreoscutellaris Breuning, 1942

Species of beetle

Esthlogenopsis ochreoscutellaris is a species of beetle in the family Cerambycidae. It was described by Stephan von Breuning in 1942. It is known from Brazil.
