= Esthlogenopsis =

Scientific classification
- Domain: Eukaryota
- Kingdom: Animalia
- Phylum: Arthropoda
- Class: Insecta
- Order: Coleoptera
- Suborder: Polyphaga
- Infraorder: Cucujiformia
- Family: Cerambycidae
- Tribe: Pteropliini
- Genus: Esthlogenopsis

Genus of beetles

Esthlogenopsis is a genus of longhorn beetles of the subfamily Lamiinae, containing the following species:

- Esthlogenopsis atlantica Monne & Monne, 2006
- Esthlogenopsis ochreoscutellaris Breuning, 1942
