= Paramoron =

Scientific classification
- Domain: Eukaryota
- Kingdom: Animalia
- Phylum: Arthropoda
- Class: Insecta
- Order: Coleoptera
- Suborder: Polyphaga
- Infraorder: Cucujiformia
- Family: Cerambycidae
- Tribe: Pteropliini
- Genus: Paramoron

Genus of beetles

Paramoron is a genus of longhorn beetles of the subfamily Lamiinae, containing the following species:

- Paramoron diadematum (Heller, 1910)
- Paramoron singulare Aurivillius, 1908
