= Paramoron diadematum =

Scientific classification
- Domain: Eukaryota
- Kingdom: Animalia
- Phylum: Arthropoda
- Class: Insecta
- Order: Coleoptera
- Suborder: Polyphaga
- Infraorder: Cucujiformia
- Family: Cerambycidae
- Tribe: Pteropliini
- Genus: Paramoron
- Species: P. diadematum

Binomial name
- Paramoron diadematum (Heller, 1910)

Synonyms
- Menyllodes diadematum Heller, 1910

Species of beetle

Paramoron diadematum is a species of beetle in the family Cerambycidae. It was described by Heller in 1910, originally under the genus Menyllodes.
