= Paraniphona niphonoides =

Scientific classification
- Kingdom: Animalia
- Phylum: Arthropoda
- Class: Insecta
- Order: Coleoptera
- Suborder: Polyphaga
- Infraorder: Cucujiformia
- Family: Cerambycidae
- Genus: Paraniphona
- Species: P. niphonoides

Binomial name
- Paraniphona niphonoides Breuning, 1970

Species of beetle

Paraniphona niphonoides is a species of beetle in the family Cerambycidae. It was described by Stephan von Breuning in 1970.
