= Paraniphona =

Scientific classification
- Kingdom: Animalia
- Phylum: Arthropoda
- Class: Insecta
- Order: Coleoptera
- Suborder: Polyphaga
- Infraorder: Cucujiformia
- Family: Cerambycidae
- Tribe: Pteropliini
- Genus: Paraniphona

Genus of beetles

Paraniphona is a genus of longhorn beetles of the subfamily Lamiinae, containing the following species:

- Paraniphona niphonoides Breuning, 1970
- Paraniphona rotundipennis Breuning, 1974
