= Paraniphona rotundipennis =

Scientific classification
- Kingdom: Animalia
- Phylum: Arthropoda
- Class: Insecta
- Order: Coleoptera
- Suborder: Polyphaga
- Infraorder: Cucujiformia
- Family: Cerambycidae
- Genus: Paraniphona
- Species: P. rotundipennis

Binomial name
- Paraniphona rotundipennis Breuning, 1974

Species of beetle

Paraniphona rotundipennis is a species of beetle that belongs to the family Cerambycidae. It is widespread across Asia being found in places such as India, Russia, China, Hong kong, Korea (north and south) and possibly Japan. It may possibly be found in Bhutan, Nepal and Myanmar.

It was described by Stephan von Breuning in 1974.
