= Agniolophia schurmanni =

Scientific classification
- Domain: Eukaryota
- Kingdom: Animalia
- Phylum: Arthropoda
- Class: Insecta
- Order: Coleoptera
- Suborder: Polyphaga
- Infraorder: Cucujiformia
- Family: Cerambycidae
- Tribe: Pteropliini
- Genus: Agniolophia
- Species: A. schurmanni

Binomial name
- Agniolophia schurmanni Breuning, 1983

Species of beetle

Agniolophia schurmanni is a species of beetle in the family Cerambycidae. It was described by Stephan von Breuning in 1983. It is known from Micronesia.
