= Agniolophia =

Scientific classification
- Kingdom: Animalia
- Phylum: Arthropoda
- Class: Insecta
- Order: Coleoptera
- Suborder: Polyphaga
- Infraorder: Cucujiformia
- Family: Cerambycidae
- Tribe: Pteropliini
- Genus: Agniolophia; Breuning, 1938

Genus of beetles

Agniolophia is a genus of longhorn beetles of the subfamily Lamiinae, containing the following species:

- Agniolophia schurmanni Breuning, 1983
- Agniolophia trivittata Breuning, 1938
