= Spinosodus spinicollis =

Scientific classification
- Kingdom: Animalia
- Phylum: Arthropoda
- Clade: Pancrustacea
- Class: Insecta
- Order: Coleoptera
- Suborder: Polyphaga
- Infraorder: Cucujiformia
- Family: Cerambycidae
- Genus: Spinosodus
- Species: S. spinicollis

Binomial name
- Spinosodus spinicollis Breuning & de Jong, 1941

Species of beetle

Spinosodus spinicollis is a species of beetle in the family Cerambycidae. It was described by Stephan von Breuning and de Jong in 1941. It is known from Java and Borneo.
