= Spinosodus =

Scientific classification
- Kingdom: Animalia
- Phylum: Arthropoda
- Clade: Pancrustacea
- Class: Insecta
- Order: Coleoptera
- Suborder: Polyphaga
- Infraorder: Cucujiformia
- Family: Cerambycidae
- Tribe: Pteropliini
- Genus: Spinosodus

Genus of beetles

Spinosodus is a genus of longhorn beetles of the subfamily Lamiinae, containing the following species:

- Spinosodus rufomaculatus Breuning, 1973;
- Spinosodus spinicollis Breuning & de Jong, 1941.
