= Micropraonetha =

Scientific classification
- Kingdom: Animalia
- Phylum: Arthropoda
- Class: Insecta
- Order: Coleoptera
- Suborder: Polyphaga
- Infraorder: Cucujiformia
- Family: Cerambycidae
- Tribe: Pteropliini
- Genus: Micropraonetha; Breuning, 1939

Type species
- Micropraonetha carinipennis Breuning, 1939

Genus of beetles

Micropraonetha is a genus of longhorn beetles of the subfamily Lamiinae, containing the following species:

- Micropraonetha carinipennis Breuning, 1939
- Micropraonetha multituberculata Breuning, 1982
