= Pseudeuclea =

Scientific classification
- Kingdom: Animalia
- Phylum: Arthropoda
- Class: Insecta
- Order: Coleoptera
- Suborder: Polyphaga
- Infraorder: Cucujiformia
- Family: Cerambycidae
- Tribe: Pteropliini
- Genus: Pseudeuclea

Genus of beetles

Pseudeuclea is a genus of longhorn beetles of the subfamily Lamiinae, containing the following species:

- Pseudeuclea cribrosa Schwarzer, 1931
- Pseudeuclea roseolata Breuning, 1961
