= Pseudeuclea cribrosa =

Scientific classification
- Kingdom: Animalia
- Phylum: Arthropoda
- Class: Insecta
- Order: Coleoptera
- Suborder: Polyphaga
- Infraorder: Cucujiformia
- Family: Cerambycidae
- Genus: Pseudeuclea
- Species: P. cribrosa

Binomial name
- Pseudeuclea cribrosa Schwarzer, 1931

Species of beetle

Pseudeuclea cribrosa is a species of beetle in the family Cerambycidae. It was described by Bernhard Schwarzer in 1931. It is known from Borneo.
