= Pseudeuclea roseolata =

Scientific classification
- Kingdom: Animalia
- Phylum: Arthropoda
- Class: Insecta
- Order: Coleoptera
- Suborder: Polyphaga
- Infraorder: Cucujiformia
- Family: Cerambycidae
- Genus: Pseudeuclea
- Species: P. roseolata

Binomial name
- Pseudeuclea roseolata Breuning, 1961

Species of beetle

Pseudeuclea roseolata is a species of beetle in the family Cerambycidae. It was described by Stephan von Breuning in 1961.
