= Trichopterolophia schurmanni =

Scientific classification
- Kingdom: Animalia
- Phylum: Arthropoda
- Class: Insecta
- Order: Coleoptera
- Suborder: Polyphaga
- Infraorder: Cucujiformia
- Family: Cerambycidae
- Genus: Trichopterolophia
- Species: T. schurmanni

Binomial name
- Trichopterolophia schurmanni Breuning, 1980

Species of beetle

Trichopterolophia schurmanni is a species of beetle in the family Cerambycidae. It was described by Stephan von Breuning in 1980.
