= Trichopterolophia andamanica =

Scientific classification
- Kingdom: Animalia
- Phylum: Arthropoda
- Class: Insecta
- Order: Coleoptera
- Suborder: Polyphaga
- Infraorder: Cucujiformia
- Family: Cerambycidae
- Genus: Trichopterolophia
- Species: T. andamanica

Binomial name
- Trichopterolophia andamanica Breuning, 1960

Species of beetle

Trichopterolophia andamanica is a species of beetle in the family Cerambycidae. It was described by Stephan von Breuning in 1960.
