= Trichopterolophia =

Scientific classification
- Kingdom: Animalia
- Phylum: Arthropoda
- Class: Insecta
- Order: Coleoptera
- Suborder: Polyphaga
- Infraorder: Cucujiformia
- Family: Cerambycidae
- Tribe: Pteropliini
- Genus: Trichopterolophia

Genus of beetles

Trichopterolophia is a genus of longhorn beetles of the subfamily Lamiinae, containing the following species:

- Trichopterolophia andamanica Breuning, 1960
- Trichopterolophia schurmanni Breuning, 1980
