= Zaeeroides luzonica =

Scientific classification
- Kingdom: Animalia
- Phylum: Arthropoda
- Class: Insecta
- Order: Coleoptera
- Suborder: Polyphaga
- Infraorder: Cucujiformia
- Family: Cerambycidae
- Genus: Zaeeroides
- Species: Z. luzonica

Binomial name
- Zaeeroides luzonica Breuning, 1938

Species of beetle

Zaeeroides luzonica is a species of beetle in the family Cerambycidae. It was described by Stephan von Breuning in 1938. It is known from the Philippines.
