= Zaeeroides florensis =

Scientific classification
- Kingdom: Animalia
- Phylum: Arthropoda
- Class: Insecta
- Order: Coleoptera
- Suborder: Polyphaga
- Infraorder: Cucujiformia
- Family: Cerambycidae
- Genus: Zaeeroides
- Species: Z. florensis

Binomial name
- Zaeeroides florensis Breuning, 1959

Species of beetle

Zaeeroides florensis is a species of beetle in the family Cerambycidae. It was described by Stephan von Breuning in 1959.
