= Zaeeroides =

Scientific classification
- Kingdom: Animalia
- Phylum: Arthropoda
- Class: Insecta
- Order: Coleoptera
- Suborder: Polyphaga
- Infraorder: Cucujiformia
- Family: Cerambycidae
- Tribe: Pteropliini
- Genus: Zaeeroides

Genus of beetles

Zaeeroides is a genus of longhorn beetles of the subfamily Lamiinae, containing the following species:

- Zaeeroides florensis Breuning, 1959
- Zaeeroides luzonica Breuning, 1938
