= Tigranella vieui =

Scientific classification
- Kingdom: Animalia
- Phylum: Arthropoda
- Class: Insecta
- Order: Coleoptera
- Suborder: Polyphaga
- Infraorder: Cucujiformia
- Family: Cerambycidae
- Genus: Tigranella
- Species: T. vieui

Binomial name
- Tigranella vieui Breuning, 1965

Species of beetle

Tigranella vieui is a species of beetle in the family Cerambycidae. It was described by Stephan von Breuning in 1965.
