= Mesosella kumei =

Scientific classification
- Kingdom: Animalia
- Phylum: Arthropoda
- Class: Insecta
- Order: Coleoptera
- Suborder: Polyphaga
- Infraorder: Cucujiformia
- Family: Cerambycidae
- Genus: Mesosella
- Species: M. kumei

Binomial name
- Mesosella kumei Takakuwa, 1984

Species of beetle

Mesosella kumei is a species of beetle in the family Cerambycidae. It was described by Takakuwa in 1984.
