= Pterolophia lateripicta =

Scientific classification
- Kingdom: Animalia
- Phylum: Arthropoda
- Clade: Pancrustacea
- Class: Insecta
- Order: Coleoptera
- Suborder: Polyphaga
- Infraorder: Cucujiformia
- Family: Cerambycidae
- Genus: Pterolophia
- Species: P. lateripicta

Binomial name
- Pterolophia lateripicta (Fairmaire, 1879)

Synonyms
- Pterolophia laevepunctata Breuning, 1938; Pterolophia singatoka Dillon & Dillon, 1952; Pterolophia ongea Dillon & Dillon, 1952; Pterolophia vitiensis Dillon & Dillon, 1952; Pterolophia thawathi Dillon & Dillon, 1952; Pterolophia tholo Dillon & Dillon, 1952; Oopsis lateripicta Fairmaire, 1879

Species of beetle

Pterolophia lateripicta is a species of beetle in the family Cerambycidae. It was described by Léon Fairmaire in 1879, originally under the genus Oopsis. It is known from Fiji.
