= Tmesisternus dubius =

Scientific classification
- Domain: Eukaryota
- Kingdom: Animalia
- Phylum: Arthropoda
- Class: Insecta
- Order: Coleoptera
- Suborder: Polyphaga
- Infraorder: Cucujiformia
- Family: Cerambycidae
- Genus: Tmesisternus
- Species: T. dubius

Binomial name
- Tmesisternus dubius Montrouzier, 1855

Species of beetle

Tmesisternus dubius is a species of beetle in the family Cerambycidae. It was described by Xavier Montrouzier in 1855.

== Subspecies ==
- Tmesisternus dubius rufithorax Breuning, 1956
- Tmesisternus dubius dubius Montrouzier, 1855
- Tmesisternus dubius saintaignani Breuning, 1982
