= Prosoplus australis =

Scientific classification
- Kingdom: Animalia
- Phylum: Arthropoda
- Clade: Pancrustacea
- Class: Insecta
- Order: Coleoptera
- Suborder: Polyphaga
- Infraorder: Cucujiformia
- Family: Cerambycidae
- Genus: Prosoplus
- Species: P. australis

Binomial name
- Prosoplus australis (Montrouzier, 1861)

Synonyms
- Prosacanthia chevrolati Fauvel, 1862; Prosoplus signatus Fauvel, 1906; Micracantha australis Montrouzier, 1861

Species of beetle

Prosoplus australis is a species of beetle in the family Cerambycidae. It was described by Xavier Montrouzier in 1861. It is known from New Caledonia.
