= Eczemotes undata =

Scientific classification
- Kingdom: Animalia
- Phylum: Arthropoda
- Class: Insecta
- Order: Coleoptera
- Suborder: Polyphaga
- Infraorder: Cucujiformia
- Family: Cerambycidae
- Genus: Eczemotes
- Species: E. undata

Binomial name
- Eczemotes undata (Montrouzier, 1855)

Synonyms
- Eczemotes conferta (Pascoe) Pascoe, 1864; Penthea conferta Pascoe, 1859

Species of beetle

Eczemotes undata is a species of beetle in the family Cerambycidae. It was described by Xavier Montrouzier in 1855. It is known from Papua New Guinea, Australia, and Moluccas.

== Subspecies ==
- Eczemotes undata keyana Breuning, 1961
- Eczemotes undata undata (Montrouzier, 1855)
