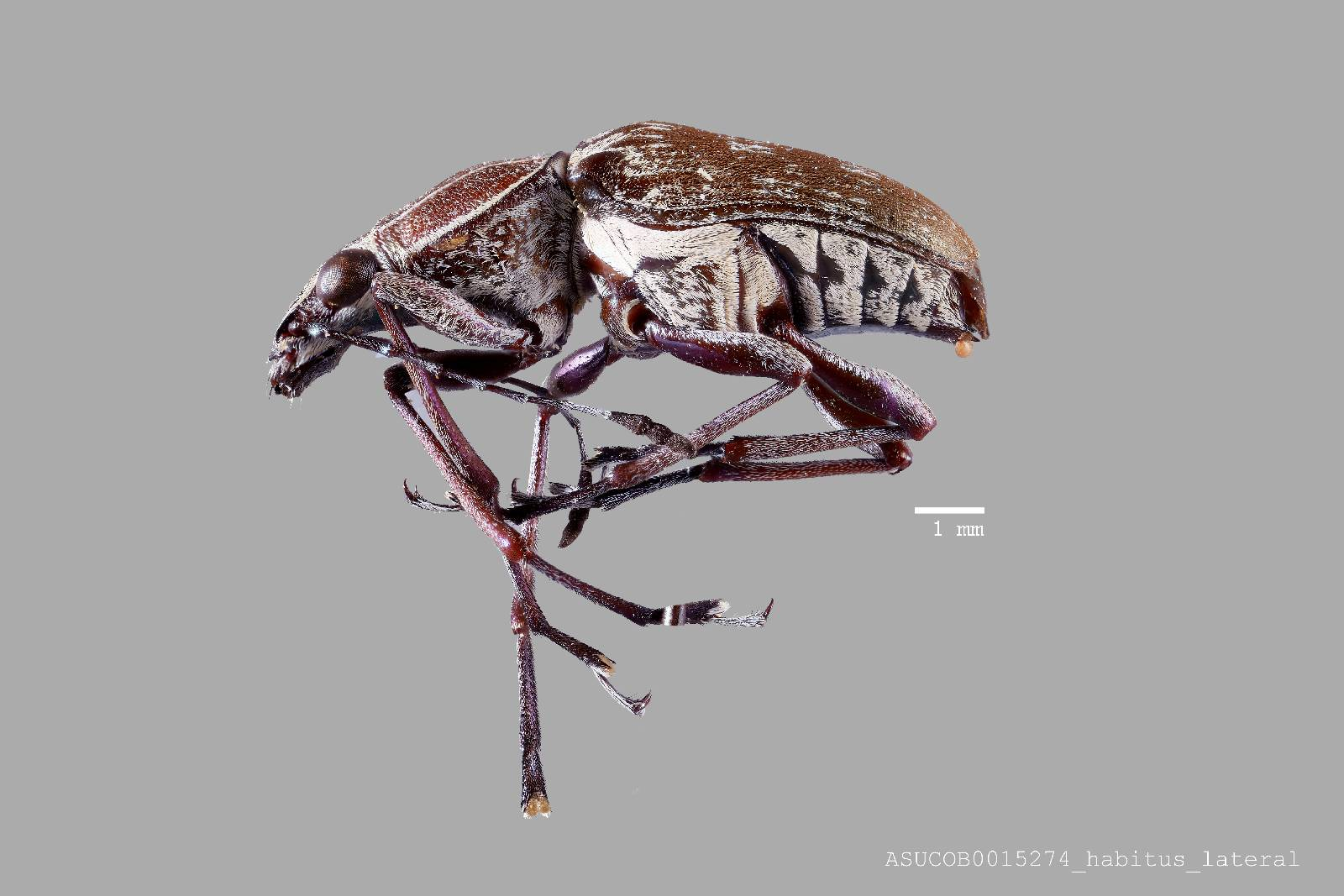

Scientific classification
- Kingdom: Animalia
- Phylum: Arthropoda
- Clade: Pancrustacea
- Class: Insecta
- Order: Coleoptera
- Suborder: Polyphaga
- Infraorder: Cucujiformia
- Superfamily: Curculionoidea
- Family: Anthribidae
- Genus: Acanthopygus
- Species: A. griseus

Binomial name
- Acanthopygus griseus Montrouzier, 1860

= Acanthopygus griseus =

Species of beetle

Acanthopygus griseus is a fungus weevil in the genus Acanthopygus, endemic to New Caledonia. It is a part of the genus Acanthopygus. This species is differentiated from other fungus weevils because it occasionally infects Litchi chinensis, the lychee tree. This is different from other fungus weevils, as they usually infect dead trees. It is hypothesized that A. griseus usually feeds on some other kind of plant, and it only feeds on L. chinensis when their usual host is not available. The damage to L. chinensis is noticed as it is a common commercial crop, but damage to less valued plants may go unnoticed.
