= Oopsis foudrasi =

Scientific classification
- Kingdom: Animalia
- Phylum: Arthropoda
- Class: Insecta
- Order: Coleoptera
- Suborder: Polyphaga
- Infraorder: Cucujiformia
- Family: Cerambycidae
- Genus: Oopsis
- Species: O. foudrasi

Binomial name
- Oopsis foudrasi (Montrouzier, 1861)

Species of beetle

Oopsis foudrasi is a species of beetle in the family Cerambycidae. It was described by Xavier Montrouzier in 1861.
