= Prosoplus woodlarkianus =

Scientific classification
- Domain: Eukaryota
- Kingdom: Animalia
- Phylum: Arthropoda
- Class: Insecta
- Order: Coleoptera
- Suborder: Polyphaga
- Infraorder: Cucujiformia
- Family: Cerambycidae
- Tribe: Pteropliini
- Genus: Prosoplus
- Species: P. woodlarkianus

Binomial name
- Prosoplus woodlarkianus (Montrouzier, 1855)

Species of beetle

Prosoplus woodlarkianus is a species of beetle in the family Cerambycidae. It was described by Xavier Montrouzier in 1855. It is known from Papua New Guinea and Australia.
