= Acalolepta artensis =

Scientific classification
- Domain: Eukaryota
- Kingdom: Animalia
- Phylum: Arthropoda
- Class: Insecta
- Order: Coleoptera
- Suborder: Polyphaga
- Infraorder: Cucujiformia
- Family: Cerambycidae
- Tribe: Lamiini
- Genus: Acalolepta
- Species: A. artensis

Binomial name
- Acalolepta artensis (Montrouzier, 1861)

Synonyms
- Dihammus artensis (Montrouzier) Breuning, 1944; Dihammus spinipennis Gahan, 1888; Monochamus artensis Montrouzier, 1861; Monochamus loyaltianus Heller; Cyriola artensis (Montrouzier) Hayashi, 1961 (misspelling)

Species of beetle

Acalolepta artensis is a species of beetle in the family Cerambycidae. It was described by Xavier Montrouzier in 1861, originally under the genus Monochamus. It is known from New Caledonia.
