= Eczemotes guttulata =

Scientific classification
- Domain: Eukaryota
- Kingdom: Animalia
- Phylum: Arthropoda
- Class: Insecta
- Order: Coleoptera
- Suborder: Polyphaga
- Infraorder: Cucujiformia
- Family: Cerambycidae
- Tribe: Pteropliini
- Genus: Eczemotes
- Species: E. guttulata

Binomial name
- Eczemotes guttulata Bates, 1877

Species of beetle

Eczemotes guttulata is a species of beetle in the family Cerambycidae. It was described by Henry Walter Bates in 1877.
