= Oopsis brenneocaudata =

Scientific classification
- Kingdom: Animalia
- Phylum: Arthropoda
- Class: Insecta
- Order: Coleoptera
- Suborder: Polyphaga
- Infraorder: Cucujiformia
- Family: Cerambycidae
- Genus: Oopsis
- Species: O. brenneocaudata

Binomial name
- Oopsis brenneocaudata Fairmaire, 1879

Species of beetle

Oopsis brenneocaudata is a species of beetle in the family Cerambycidae. It was described by Fairmaire in 1879.
