= Eczemotes =

Scientific classification
- Domain: Eukaryota
- Kingdom: Animalia
- Phylum: Arthropoda
- Class: Insecta
- Order: Coleoptera
- Suborder: Polyphaga
- Infraorder: Cucujiformia
- Family: Cerambycidae
- Tribe: Pteropliini
- Genus: Eczemotes

Genus of beetles

Eczemotes is a genus of longhorn beetles of the subfamily Lamiinae, containing the following species:

- Eczemotes affinis Breuning, 1968
- Eczemotes atomaria Pascoe, 1864
- Eczemotes cerviniapex Heller, 1914
- Eczemotes granulosa Breuning, 1938
- Eczemotes guttulata Bates, 1877
- Eczemotes saintaignani Breuning, 1982
- Eczemotes transversefasciata Breuning, 1940
- Eczemotes undata (Montrouzier, 1855)
