= Prosoplus giloloensis =

Scientific classification
- Kingdom: Animalia
- Phylum: Arthropoda
- Class: Insecta
- Order: Coleoptera
- Suborder: Polyphaga
- Infraorder: Cucujiformia
- Family: Cerambycidae
- Genus: Prosoplus
- Species: P. giloloensis

Binomial name
- Prosoplus giloloensis Breuning, 1943

Species of beetle

Prosoplus giloloensis is a species of beetle in the family Cerambycidae. It was described by Stephan von Breuning in 1943.

== Subspecies ==
- Prosoplus giloloensis rotundipennis Breuning, 1943
- Prosoplus giloloensis giloloensis Breuning, 1943
