= Prosoplus sinuatofasciatus =

Scientific classification
- Kingdom: Animalia
- Phylum: Arthropoda
- Class: Insecta
- Order: Coleoptera
- Suborder: Polyphaga
- Infraorder: Cucujiformia
- Family: Cerambycidae
- Genus: Prosoplus
- Species: P. sinuatofasciatus

Binomial name
- Prosoplus sinuatofasciatus Blanchard, 1855

Species of beetle

Prosoplus sinuatofasciatus is a species of beetle in the family Cerambycidae. It was described by Blanchard in 1855.

== Subspecies ==
- Prosoplus sinuatofasciatus woodlarkianus Breuning, 1970
- Prosoplus sinuatofasciatus sinuatofasciatus Blanchard, 1855
