= Oopsis nutator =

Scientific classification
- Kingdom: Animalia
- Phylum: Arthropoda
- Clade: Pancrustacea
- Class: Insecta
- Order: Coleoptera
- Suborder: Polyphaga
- Infraorder: Cucujiformia
- Family: Cerambycidae
- Genus: Oopsis
- Species: O. nutator

Binomial name
- Oopsis nutator (Fabricius, 1787)

Species of beetle

Oopsis nutator is a species of beetle in the family Cerambycidae. It was described by Johan Christian Fabricius in 1787.
