= Prosoplus granulifer =

Scientific classification
- Kingdom: Animalia
- Phylum: Arthropoda
- Class: Insecta
- Order: Coleoptera
- Suborder: Polyphaga
- Infraorder: Cucujiformia
- Family: Cerambycidae
- Genus: Prosoplus
- Species: P. granulifer

Binomial name
- Prosoplus granulifer Breuning, 1939

Species of beetle

Prosoplus granulifer is a species of beetle in the family Cerambycidae. It was described by Stephan von Breuning in 1939 in the catalogue of life based on cerambycidae database. It is known from Papua New Guinea.
