= Prosoplus xyalopus =

Scientific classification
- Domain: Eukaryota
- Kingdom: Animalia
- Phylum: Arthropoda
- Class: Insecta
- Order: Coleoptera
- Suborder: Polyphaga
- Infraorder: Cucujiformia
- Family: Cerambycidae
- Tribe: Pteropliini
- Genus: Prosoplus
- Species: P. xyalopus

Binomial name
- Prosoplus xyalopus (Karsch, 1881)

Synonyms
- Prosoplus yapensis Aurivillius, 1908

Species of beetle

Prosoplus xyalopus is a species of beetle in the family Cerambycidae. It was described by Ferdinand Karsch in 1881. It is known from Micronesia.
