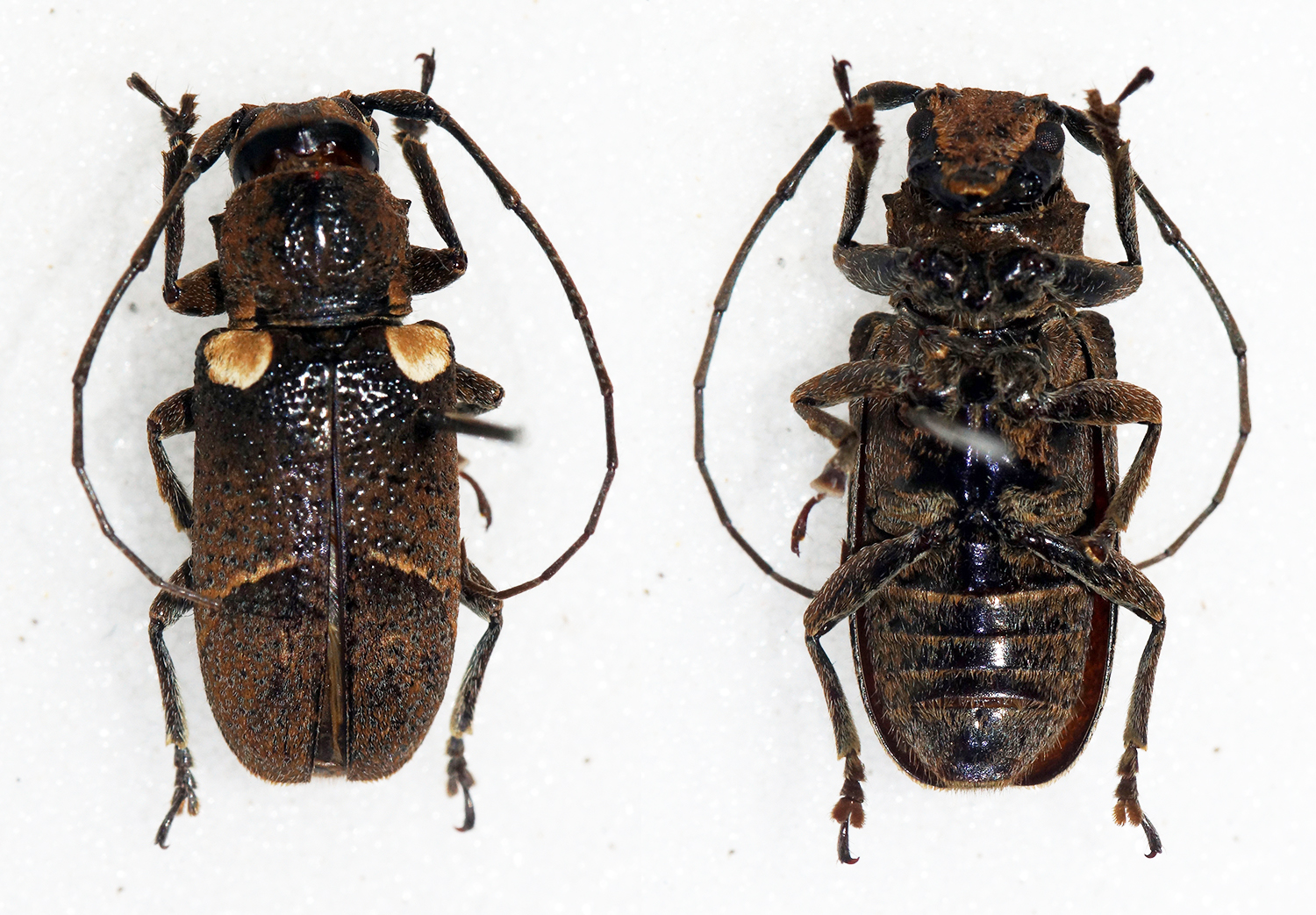
- Prosoplus bimaculatus (female)

Scientific classification
- Kingdom: Animalia
- Phylum: Arthropoda
- Class: Insecta
- Order: Coleoptera
- Suborder: Polyphaga
- Infraorder: Cucujiformia
- Family: Cerambycidae
- Subfamily: Lamiinae
- Tribe: Pteropliini
- Genus: Prosoplus; Blanchard, 1853

= Prosoplus =

Genus of beetles

Prosoplus is a genus of longhorn beetles of the subfamily Lamiinae, containing the following species:

subgenus Escharodes

- Prosoplus carinicollis (Pascoe, 1864)
- Prosoplus celebicus Breuning, 1959
- Prosoplus convexicollis Breuning, 1951
- Prosoplus criminosus (Pascoe, 1864)
- Prosoplus distinctus (Pascoe, 1864)
- Prosoplus flavoguttatus (Aurivillius, 1925)
- Prosoplus fuscobasalis Breuning, 1947
- Prosoplus granulifer Breuning, 1939
- Prosoplus granulosus (Breuning, 1938)
- Prosoplus interruptus (Pascoe, 1864)
- Prosoplus invidus (Pascoe, 1864)
- Prosoplus paganoides Breuning, 1940
- Prosoplus paganus (Pascoe, 1864)
- Prosoplus parapaganus Breuning, 1976
- Prosoplus parvulus (Breuning, 1938)
- Prosoplus strenuus (Pascoe, 1864)
- Prosoplus subinterruptus Breuning, 1969
- Prosoplus sumatranus Breuning & de Jong, 1941
- Prosoplus tuberosicollis Breuning, 1939

subgenus Ochreoprosoplus

- Prosoplus bialbomaculatus Breuning, 1959
- Prosoplus ochreopictus Breuning, 1940

subgenus Prosoplus

- Prosoplus abdominalis (White, 1858)
- Prosoplus affectus (Pascoe, 1864)
- Prosoplus affinis Breuning, 1938
- Prosoplus albertisi Breuning, 1943
- Prosoplus albescens Breuning, 1938
- Prosoplus albidus Aurivillius, 1917
- Prosoplus albifrons Breuning, 1963
- Prosoplus albofasciatus Breuning, 1938
- Prosoplus albomarmoratus Breuning, 1938
- Prosoplus albosticticus Breuning, 1938
- Prosoplus albostriatus Breuning, 1938
- Prosoplus albovestitus Breuning, 1970
- Prosoplus aluensis Breuning, 1961
- Prosoplus amboinicus Breuning, 1974
- Prosoplus ammiralis Breuning, 1938
- Prosoplus aneityumensis Breuning, 1974
- Prosoplus aruensis Breuning, 1966
- Prosoplus aspersus (Montrouzier, 1855)
- Prosoplus assimilis (Montrouzier, 1855)
- Prosoplus atlanticus Breuning, 1938
- Prosoplus auberti Breuning, 1961
- Prosoplus australis (Montrouzier, 1861)
- Prosoplus bakewellii (Pascoe, 1859)
- Prosoplus bankii (Fabricius, 1775)
- Prosoplus basalis Breuning, 1938
- Prosoplus basigranulatus Breuning & de Jong, 1941
- Prosoplus basimaculatus Breuning, 1938
- Prosoplus basiochraceus Breuning, 1943
- Prosoplus basivittatus Breuning, 1940
- Prosoplus beccarii Breuning, 1939
- Prosoplus bellus Breuning, 1949
- Prosoplus bicoloripennis Breuning, 1953
- Prosoplus bilatemaculatus Breuning, 1959
- Prosoplus bimaculatus Aurivillius, 1907
- Prosoplus bimaculipennis Breuning, 1961
- Prosoplus bougainvillei Breuning, 1954
- Prosoplus brunneus Breuning, 1938
- Prosoplus carinatus Breuning, 1938
- Prosoplus celebensis Breuning & de Jong, 1941
- Prosoplus celebianus Breuning, 1971
- Prosoplus comosus (Newman, 1842)
- Prosoplus costatus Hüdepohl, 1996
- Prosoplus cylindricus Breuning, 1953
- Prosoplus decussatus Breuning, 1957
- Prosoplus demarzi Breuning, 1963
- Prosoplus densepunctatus Breuning, 1938
- Prosoplus densepuncticollis Breuning, 1969
- Prosoplus dentatus (Olivier, 1792)
- Prosoplus dubiosus Breuning, 1943
- Prosoplus dunni Breuning, 1976
- Prosoplus elongatus Breuning, 1938
- Prosoplus encaustus (Pascoe, 1864)
- Prosoplus endata (McKeown, 1942)
- Prosoplus fergussoni Breuning, 1970
- Prosoplus fijianus Breuning, 1948
- Prosoplus flavescens Breuning, 1938
- Prosoplus flavosticticus Breuning, 1938
- Prosoplus florensis Breuning, 1969
- Prosoplus funebris Breuning, 1939
- Prosoplus fuscomaculatus Breuning, 1938
- Prosoplus fuscosignatus Breuning, 1974
- Prosoplus fuscosticticus Breuning, 1961
- Prosoplus gebiensis Breuning, 1958
- Prosoplus giloloensis Breuning, 1943
- Prosoplus griseofasciatus Breuning, 1938
- Prosoplus grisescens Breuning, 1938
- Prosoplus grossepunctatus Breuning, 1938
- Prosoplus hebridarum Breuning, 1961
- Prosoplus hibisci Gressitt, 1956
- Prosoplus hirsutus Breuning, 1938
- Prosoplus imitans Breuning, 1961
- Prosoplus infelix (Pascoe, 1864)
- Prosoplus intercalaris (Pascoe, 1867)
- Prosoplus intermissus (Pascoe, 1864)
- Prosoplus javanicus Aurivillius, 1916
- Prosoplus jobiensis Breuning, 1938
- Prosoplus jubatus (Pascoe, 1864)
- Prosoplus kambangensis Breuning & de Jong, 1941
- Prosoplus kinabaluensis Breuning, 1966
- Prosoplus laevepunctatus Breuning, 1938
- Prosoplus latefasciatus Breuning, 1959
- Prosoplus laterialbus Breuning, 1971
- Prosoplus laterinigricollis Breuning, 1961
- Prosoplus lividus Matsushita, 1935
- Prosoplus longulus Breuning, 1938
- Prosoplus loriai Breuning, 1939
- Prosoplus luzonicus Breuning, 1960
- Prosoplus maculosus (Pascoe, 1864)
- Prosoplus major Gressitt, 1956
- Prosoplus majoripennis Breuning, 1972
- Prosoplus marianarum Aurivillius, 1908
- Prosoplus marmoratus Breuning, 1938
- Prosoplus marmoreus Breuning, 1938
- Prosoplus mediofasciatus Breuning, 1938
- Prosoplus mediovittatus Breuning, 1961
- Prosoplus metallescens Breuning, 1938
- Prosoplus metallicus (Pic, 1935)
- Prosoplus mindanaonis Breuning, 1974
- Prosoplus minimus Breuning, 1938
- Prosoplus molestus (Pascoe, 1864)
- Prosoplus morokaiensis Breuning, 1968
- Prosoplus multiguttatus Breuning, 1938
- Prosoplus multimaculatus Breuning, 1943
- Prosoplus neopomerianus Breuning, 1938
- Prosoplus niasicus Breuning, 1939
- Prosoplus nigrosignatus Breuning, 1950
- Prosoplus nitens Breuning, 1938
- Prosoplus obiensis Breuning, 1968
- Prosoplus obliqueplagiatus Breuning, 1938
- Prosoplus obliquestriatus Breuning, 1938
- Prosoplus obliquevittatus Breuning, 1970
- Prosoplus oblitus (Pascoe, 1863)
- Prosoplus ochraceomarmoratus Breuning, 1938
- Prosoplus ochreobasalis Breuning, 1942 inq.
- Prosoplus ochreosparsus Breuning, 1938
- Prosoplus ochreosticticus Breuning & de Jong, 1941
- Prosoplus ominosus (Pascoe, 1864)
- Prosoplus ornatifrons Breuning, 1938
- Prosoplus papuanus Breuning, 1938
- Prosoplus parallelus Breuning, 1938
- Prosoplus parasilis Breuning, 1978
- Prosoplus pauxillus (Blackburn, 1901)
- Prosoplus peraffinis Breuning, 1938
- Prosoplus persimilis Breuning, 1938
- Prosoplus petechialis (Pascoe, 1865)
- Prosoplus pictus Breuning, 1939
- Prosoplus pilipennis Breuning, 1982
- Prosoplus pilosus Breuning, 1938
- Prosoplus pseudobasalis Breuning, 1938
- Prosoplus pseudovalgus Breuning, 1938
- Prosoplus pulcher (Aurivillius, 1908)
- Prosoplus pullatus (Pascoe, 1859)
- Prosoplus romani Breuning, 1938
- Prosoplus rosselli Breuning, 1982
- Prosoplus rufobrunneus Breuning, 1938
- Prosoplus rugulosus Breuning, 1938
- Prosoplus samoanus Aurivillius, 1913
- Prosoplus schultzei Breuning, 1960
- Prosoplus seriemaculatus Breuning, 1961
- Prosoplus setipes Breuning, 1970
- Prosoplus signatoides Breuning, 1939
- Prosoplus similis Breuning, 1961
- Prosoplus sinuatofasciatus Blanchard, 1855
- Prosoplus sinuatus Breuning, 1938
- Prosoplus sparsutus (Pascoe, 1864)
- Prosoplus strandi Breuning, 1938
- Prosoplus strandiellus Breuning, 1938
- Prosoplus sturninus (Pascoe, 1864)
- Prosoplus subcarinatus Breuning, 1970
- Prosoplus subviduatus Breuning, 1976
- Prosoplus sumatrensis Breuning, 1973
- Prosoplus tenimberensis Breuning, 1965
- Prosoplus ternatensis Breuning, 1943
- Prosoplus toekanensis Breuning, 1959
- Prosoplus tristiculus Breuning, 1939
- Prosoplus trobriandensis Breuning, 1947
- Prosoplus truncatus (Pascoe, 1864)
- Prosoplus tulagensis Breuning, 1961
- Prosoplus unicolor Breuning, 1938
- Prosoplus uniformis (Pascoe, 1864)
- Prosoplus vanicorensis Breuning, 1940
- Prosoplus ventralis Aurivillius, 1928
- Prosoplus vexatus (Pascoe, 1864)
- Prosoplus viduatus (Pascoe, 1864)
- Prosoplus villaris (Pascoe, 1864)
- Prosoplus villaroides Breuning, 1978
- Prosoplus woodlarkianus (Montrouzier, 1855)
- Prosoplus xyalopus (Karsch, 1881)
