= Prosoplus costatus =

Scientific classification
- Kingdom: Animalia
- Phylum: Arthropoda
- Class: Insecta
- Order: Coleoptera
- Suborder: Polyphaga
- Infraorder: Cucujiformia
- Family: Cerambycidae
- Genus: Prosoplus
- Species: P. costatus

Binomial name
- Prosoplus costatus Hüdepohl, 1996

Synonyms
- Rhytiphora huedepohli Tavakilian & Nearns, 2010

Species of beetle

Prosoplus costatus is a species of beetle in the family Cerambycidae. It was described by Karl-Ernst Hüdepohl in 1996. It is known from Borneo and Malaysia.
