= Prosoplus intermissus =

Scientific classification
- Domain: Eukaryota
- Kingdom: Animalia
- Phylum: Arthropoda
- Class: Insecta
- Order: Coleoptera
- Suborder: Polyphaga
- Infraorder: Cucujiformia
- Family: Cerambycidae
- Tribe: Pteropliini
- Genus: Prosoplus
- Species: P. intermissus

Binomial name
- Prosoplus intermissus (Pascoe, 1864)

Synonyms
- Prosoplus metallicus (Pic) Vives, Aberlenc & Sudre, 2008

Species of beetle

Prosoplus intermissus is a species of beetle in the family Cerambycidae. It was described by Francis Polkinghorne Pascoe in 1864. It is known from the Solomon Islands and Papua New Guinea.
