= Prosoplus dentatus =

Scientific classification
- Kingdom: Animalia
- Phylum: Arthropoda
- Clade: Pancrustacea
- Class: Insecta
- Order: Coleoptera
- Suborder: Polyphaga
- Infraorder: Cucujiformia
- Family: Cerambycidae
- Genus: Prosoplus
- Species: P. dentatus

Binomial name
- Prosoplus dentatus (Olivier, 1792)

Synonyms
- Lamia spinipes (Olivier, 1795); Lamia dentata Olivier, 1792; Cerambix spinipes Olivier, 1795; Micracantha madecassa Künckel, 1890; Micracantha desjardinsii Fairmaire, 1889

Species of beetle

Prosoplus dentatus is a species of beetle in the family Cerambycidae. It was described by Guillaume-Antoine Olivier in 1792. It is known from Mauritius, Seychelles, Réunion, and Madagascar. It contains the varietas Prosoplus dentatus var. ochreomaculatus.
