= Prosoplus marmoreus =

Scientific classification
- Domain: Eukaryota
- Kingdom: Animalia
- Phylum: Arthropoda
- Class: Insecta
- Order: Coleoptera
- Suborder: Polyphaga
- Infraorder: Cucujiformia
- Family: Cerambycidae
- Tribe: Pteropliini
- Genus: Prosoplus
- Species: P. marmoreus

Binomial name
- Prosoplus marmoreus Breuning, 1938

Species of insect

Prosoplus marmoreus is a species of beetle in the family Cerambycidae. It was described by Stephan von Breuning in 1938.
