= Prosoplus decussatus =

Scientific classification
- Kingdom: Animalia
- Phylum: Arthropoda
- Class: Insecta
- Order: Coleoptera
- Suborder: Polyphaga
- Infraorder: Cucujiformia
- Family: Cerambycidae
- Genus: Prosoplus
- Species: P. decussatus

Binomial name
- Prosoplus decussatus Breuning, 1957

Species of beetle

Prosoplus decussatus is a species of beetle in the family Cerambycidae. It was described by Stephan von Breuning in 1957. The species is dark brown in colour and is 10–12 millimetres (0.39–0.47 in) long and 3.5–4.5 millimetres (0.14–0.18 in) wide. It is endemic to New Guinea.
