= Prosoplus paganus =

Scientific classification
- Kingdom: Animalia
- Phylum: Arthropoda
- Class: Insecta
- Order: Coleoptera
- Suborder: Polyphaga
- Infraorder: Cucujiformia
- Family: Cerambycidae
- Genus: Prosoplus
- Species: P. paganus

Binomial name
- Prosoplus paganus (Pascoe, 1864)

Synonyms
- Escharodes paganus Pascoe, 1864

Species of beetle

Prosoplus paganus is a species of beetle in the family Cerambycidae. It was described by Francis Polkinghorne Pascoe in 1864. It is known from Moluccas and Papua New Guinea.
