= Oopsis zitja =

Scientific classification
- Kingdom: Animalia
- Phylum: Arthropoda
- Class: Insecta
- Order: Coleoptera
- Suborder: Polyphaga
- Infraorder: Cucujiformia
- Family: Cerambycidae
- Genus: Oopsis
- Species: O. zitja

Binomial name
- Oopsis zitja Dillon & Dillon, 1952

Species of beetle

Oopsis zitja is a species of beetle in the family Cerambycidae. It was described by Dillon and Dillon in 1952.
