= Eczemotes cerviniapex =

Scientific classification
- Domain: Eukaryota
- Kingdom: Animalia
- Phylum: Arthropoda
- Class: Insecta
- Order: Coleoptera
- Suborder: Polyphaga
- Infraorder: Cucujiformia
- Family: Cerambycidae
- Tribe: Pteropliini
- Genus: Eczemotes
- Species: E. cerviniapex

Binomial name
- Eczemotes cerviniapex Heller, 1914

Species of beetle

Eczemotes cerviniapex is a species of beetle in the family Cerambycidae. It was described by Heller in 1914.
