= Oopsis keiensis =

Scientific classification
- Kingdom: Animalia
- Phylum: Arthropoda
- Class: Insecta
- Order: Coleoptera
- Suborder: Polyphaga
- Infraorder: Cucujiformia
- Family: Cerambycidae
- Genus: Oopsis
- Species: O. keiensis

Binomial name
- Oopsis keiensis Breuning, 1970

Species of beetle

Oopsis keiensis is a species of beetle in the family Cerambycidae. It was described by Breuning in 1970.
