= Oopsis marshallensis =

Scientific classification
- Kingdom: Animalia
- Phylum: Arthropoda
- Class: Insecta
- Order: Coleoptera
- Suborder: Polyphaga
- Infraorder: Cucujiformia
- Family: Cerambycidae
- Genus: Oopsis
- Species: O. marshallensis

Binomial name
- Oopsis marshallensis Gressitt, 1956

Species of beetle

Oopsis marshallensis is a species of beetle in the family Cerambycidae. It was described by Gressitt in 1956.
