= Prosoplus lividus =

Scientific classification
- Domain: Eukaryota
- Kingdom: Animalia
- Phylum: Arthropoda
- Class: Insecta
- Order: Coleoptera
- Suborder: Polyphaga
- Infraorder: Cucujiformia
- Family: Cerambycidae
- Tribe: Pteropliini
- Genus: Prosoplus
- Species: P. lividus

Binomial name
- Prosoplus lividus Matsushita, 1935

Synonyms
- Prosoplus rugosicollis Breuning, 1940

Species of beetle

Prosoplus lividus is a species of beetle in the family Cerambycidae. It was described by Masaki Matsushita in 1935.

Prosoplus lividus was also given the second designated scientific name Prosoplus rugosicollis in 1940.
