= Prosoplus laterialbus =

Scientific classification
- Domain: Eukaryota
- Kingdom: Animalia
- Phylum: Arthropoda
- Class: Insecta
- Order: Coleoptera
- Suborder: Polyphaga
- Infraorder: Cucujiformia
- Family: Cerambycidae
- Tribe: Pteropliini
- Genus: Prosoplus
- Species: P. laterialbus

Binomial name
- Prosoplus laterialbus Breuning, 1971

Synonyms
- Rhytiphora wheatcrofti Tavakilian & Nearns, 2014

Species of insect

Prosoplus laterialbus is a species of beetle in the family Cerambycidae. It was described by Stephan von Breuning in 1971.
