= Acanthopygus =

Scientific classification
- Domain: Eukaryota
- Kingdom: Animalia
- Phylum: Arthropoda
- Class: Insecta
- Order: Coleoptera
- Suborder: Polyphaga
- Infraorder: Cucujiformia
- Family: Anthribidae
- Genus: Acanthopygus; Montrouzier, 1860

Genus of beetles

Acanthopygus is a genus of beetles belonging to the family Anthribidae.

Species:

- Acanthopygus albopunctatus Montrouzier, 1860
- Acanthopygus cinctus Montrouzier, 1860
- Acanthopygus griseus Montrouzier, 1860
- Acanthopygus metallicus Montrouzier, 1860
- Acanthopygus rubricollis Montrouzier, 1860
- Acanthopygus uniformis Heller, 1916
