= Prosoplus signatoides =

Scientific classification
- Domain: Eukaryota
- Kingdom: Animalia
- Phylum: Arthropoda
- Class: Insecta
- Order: Coleoptera
- Suborder: Polyphaga
- Infraorder: Cucujiformia
- Family: Cerambycidae
- Tribe: Pteropliini
- Genus: Prosoplus
- Species: P. signatoides

Binomial name
- Prosoplus signatoides Breuning, 1939

Species of insect

Prosoplus signatoides is a species of beetle in the family Cerambycidae. It was described by Stephan von Breuning in 1939.
