= Prosoplus fijianus =

Scientific classification
- Kingdom: Animalia
- Phylum: Arthropoda
- Class: Insecta
- Order: Coleoptera
- Suborder: Polyphaga
- Infraorder: Cucujiformia
- Family: Cerambycidae
- Genus: Prosoplus
- Species: P. fijianus

Binomial name
- Prosoplus fijianus Breuning, 1948

Species of beetle

Prosoplus fijianus is a species of beetle in the family Cerambycidae. It was described by Stephan von Breuning in 1948.
