= Prosoplus major =

Scientific classification
- Kingdom: Animalia
- Phylum: Arthropoda
- Clade: Pancrustacea
- Class: Insecta
- Order: Coleoptera
- Suborder: Polyphaga
- Infraorder: Cucujiformia
- Family: Cerambycidae
- Genus: Prosoplus
- Species: P. major

Binomial name
- Prosoplus major Gressitt, 1956

Species of beetle

Prosoplus major is a species of beetle in the family Cerambycidae. It was described by Gressitt in 1956. It is found in Indonesian island of Sulawesi.
