= Prosoplus samoanus =

Scientific classification
- Domain: Eukaryota
- Kingdom: Animalia
- Phylum: Arthropoda
- Class: Insecta
- Order: Coleoptera
- Suborder: Polyphaga
- Infraorder: Cucujiformia
- Family: Cerambycidae
- Tribe: Pteropliini
- Genus: Prosoplus
- Species: P. samoanus

Binomial name
- Prosoplus samoanus Aurivillius, 1913

Species of beetle

Prosoplus samoanus is a species of beetle in the family Cerambycidae. It was described by Per Olof Christopher Aurivillius in 1913.
