= Prosoplus pauxillus =

Scientific classification
- Domain: Eukaryota
- Kingdom: Animalia
- Phylum: Arthropoda
- Class: Insecta
- Order: Coleoptera
- Suborder: Polyphaga
- Infraorder: Cucujiformia
- Family: Cerambycidae
- Tribe: Pteropliini
- Genus: Prosoplus
- Species: P. pauxillus

Binomial name
- Prosoplus pauxillus (Blackburn, 1901)

Synonyms
- Prosoplus pauxilla (Blackburn); Corrhenes cordata McKeown, 1942; Corrhenes caudata (McKeown) Breuning, 1963; Corrhenes pauxilla Blackburn, 1901

Species of beetle

Prosoplus pauxillus is a species of beetle in the family Cerambycidae. It was described by Thomas Blackburn in 1901, originally under the genus Corrhenes. It is known from Australia.
