= Prosoplus pulcher =

Scientific classification
- Domain: Eukaryota
- Kingdom: Animalia
- Phylum: Arthropoda
- Class: Insecta
- Order: Coleoptera
- Suborder: Polyphaga
- Infraorder: Cucujiformia
- Family: Cerambycidae
- Tribe: Pteropliini
- Genus: Prosoplus
- Species: P. pulcher

Binomial name
- Prosoplus pulcher (Aurivillius, 1908)

Synonyms
- Axiothea? pulchra Aurivillius, 1908

Species of beetle

Prosoplus pulcher is a species of beetle in the family Cerambycidae. It was described by Per Olof Christopher Aurivillius in 1908. It is known from Papua New Guinea.
