= Prosoplus ventralis =

Scientific classification
- Domain: Eukaryota
- Kingdom: Animalia
- Phylum: Arthropoda
- Class: Insecta
- Order: Coleoptera
- Suborder: Polyphaga
- Infraorder: Cucujiformia
- Family: Cerambycidae
- Tribe: Pteropliini
- Genus: Prosoplus
- Species: P. ventralis

Binomial name
- Prosoplus ventralis Aurivillius, 1928

Species of beetle

Prosoplus ventralis is a species of beetle in the family Cerambycidae. It was described by Per Olof Christopher Aurivillius in 1928.
