= Prosoplus fergussoni =

Scientific classification
- Domain: Eukaryota
- Kingdom: Animalia
- Phylum: Arthropoda
- Class: Insecta
- Order: Coleoptera
- Suborder: Polyphaga
- Infraorder: Cucujiformia
- Family: Cerambycidae
- Tribe: Pteropliini
- Genus: Prosoplus
- Species: P. fergussoni

Binomial name
- Prosoplus fergussoni Breuning, 1970

Species of insect

Prosoplus fergussoni is a species of beetle in the family Cerambycidae. It was described by Stephan von Breuning in 1970.
