= Prosoplus florensis =

Scientific classification
- Kingdom: Animalia
- Phylum: Arthropoda
- Class: Insecta
- Order: Coleoptera
- Suborder: Polyphaga
- Infraorder: Cucujiformia
- Family: Cerambycidae
- Genus: Prosoplus
- Species: P. florensis

Binomial name
- Prosoplus florensis Breuning, 1969

Species of beetle

Prosoplus florensis is a species of beetle in the family Cerambycidae. It was described by Stephan von Breuning in 1969.
