= Prosoplus bougainvillei =

Scientific classification
- Kingdom: Animalia
- Phylum: Arthropoda
- Class: Insecta
- Order: Coleoptera
- Suborder: Polyphaga
- Infraorder: Cucujiformia
- Family: Cerambycidae
- Genus: Prosoplus
- Species: P. bougainvillei

Binomial name
- Prosoplus bougainvillei Breuning, 1954

Species of beetle

Prosoplus bougainvillei is a species of beetle in the family Cerambycidae. It was described by Stephan von Breuning in 1954.
