= Oopsis oblongipennis =

Scientific classification
- Kingdom: Animalia
- Phylum: Arthropoda
- Class: Insecta
- Order: Coleoptera
- Suborder: Polyphaga
- Infraorder: Cucujiformia
- Family: Cerambycidae
- Genus: Oopsis
- Species: O. oblongipennis

Binomial name
- Oopsis oblongipennis Fairmaire, 1850

Species of beetle

Oopsis oblongipennis is a species of beetle in the family Cerambycidae. It was described by Fairmaire in 1850.
