= Oopsis postmaculata =

Scientific classification
- Kingdom: Animalia
- Phylum: Arthropoda
- Class: Insecta
- Order: Coleoptera
- Suborder: Polyphaga
- Infraorder: Cucujiformia
- Family: Cerambycidae
- Genus: Oopsis
- Species: O. postmaculata

Binomial name
- Oopsis postmaculata Breuning, 1939

Species of beetle

Oopsis postmaculata is a species of beetle in the family Cerambycidae. It was described by Breuning in 1939.
