= Prosoplus flavoguttatus =

Scientific classification
- Domain: Eukaryota
- Kingdom: Animalia
- Phylum: Arthropoda
- Class: Insecta
- Order: Coleoptera
- Suborder: Polyphaga
- Infraorder: Cucujiformia
- Family: Cerambycidae
- Tribe: Pteropliini
- Genus: Prosoplus
- Species: P. flavoguttatus

Binomial name
- Prosoplus flavoguttatus (Aurivillius, 1925)

Synonyms
- Axiothea flavoguttata Aurivillius, 1925

Species of beetle

Prosoplus flavoguttatus is a species of beetle in the family Cerambycidae. It was described by Per Olof Christopher Aurivillius in 1925. It is known from Papua New Guinea.
