= Prosoplus abdominalis =

Scientific classification
- Domain: Eukaryota
- Kingdom: Animalia
- Phylum: Arthropoda
- Class: Insecta
- Order: Coleoptera
- Suborder: Polyphaga
- Infraorder: Cucujiformia
- Family: Cerambycidae
- Tribe: Pteropliini
- Genus: Prosoplus
- Species: P. abdominalis

Binomial name
- Prosoplus abdominalis (White, 1858)

Species of beetle

Prosoplus abdominalis is a species of beetle in the family Cerambycidae. It was described by White in 1858.
