= Prosoplus metallicus =

Scientific classification
- Kingdom: Animalia
- Phylum: Arthropoda
- Class: Insecta
- Order: Coleoptera
- Suborder: Polyphaga
- Infraorder: Cucujiformia
- Family: Cerambycidae
- Genus: Prosoplus
- Species: P. metallicus

Binomial name
- Prosoplus metallicus (Pic, 1935)

Synonyms
- Prosoplus salomonum Breuning, 1938

Species of beetle

Prosoplus metallicus is a species of beetle in the family Cerambycidae. It was described by Maurice Pic in 1935.
