= Oopsis variivestris =

Scientific classification
- Kingdom: Animalia
- Phylum: Arthropoda
- Class: Insecta
- Order: Coleoptera
- Suborder: Polyphaga
- Infraorder: Cucujiformia
- Family: Cerambycidae
- Genus: Oopsis
- Species: O. variivestris

Binomial name
- Oopsis variivestris Fairmaire, 1879

Species of beetle

Oopsis variivestris is a species of beetle in the family Cerambycidae. It was described by Fairmaire in 1879.
