= Prosoplus maculosus =

Scientific classification
- Domain: Eukaryota
- Kingdom: Animalia
- Phylum: Arthropoda
- Class: Insecta
- Order: Coleoptera
- Suborder: Polyphaga
- Infraorder: Cucujiformia
- Family: Cerambycidae
- Tribe: Pteropliini
- Genus: Prosoplus
- Species: P. maculosus

Binomial name
- Prosoplus maculosus (Pascoe, 1864)

Species of beetle

Prosoplus maculosus is a species of beetle in the family Cerambycidae. It was described by Francis Polkinghorne Pascoe in 1864.
