= Prosoplus convexicollis =

Scientific classification
- Kingdom: Animalia
- Phylum: Arthropoda
- Class: Insecta
- Order: Coleoptera
- Suborder: Polyphaga
- Infraorder: Cucujiformia
- Family: Cerambycidae
- Genus: Prosoplus
- Species: P. convexicollis

Binomial name
- Prosoplus convexicollis Breuning, 1951

Species of beetle

Prosoplus convexicollis is a species of beetle in the family Cerambycidae. It was described by Stephan von Breuning in 1951. It is known from Papua New Guinea.
