= Oopsis albopicta =

Scientific classification
- Kingdom: Animalia
- Phylum: Arthropoda
- Class: Insecta
- Order: Coleoptera
- Suborder: Polyphaga
- Infraorder: Cucujiformia
- Family: Cerambycidae
- Genus: Oopsis
- Species: O. albopicta

Binomial name
- Oopsis albopicta Aurivillius, 1928

Species of beetle

Oopsis albopicta is a species of beetle in the family Cerambycidae. It was described by Per Olof Christopher Aurivillius in 1928.
