= Prosoplus viduatus =

Scientific classification
- Kingdom: Animalia
- Phylum: Arthropoda
- Class: Insecta
- Order: Coleoptera
- Suborder: Polyphaga
- Infraorder: Cucujiformia
- Family: Cerambycidae
- Genus: Prosoplus
- Species: P. viduatus

Binomial name
- Prosoplus viduatus (Pascoe, 1864)

Synonyms
- Aegomomus viduatus Pascoe, 1864

Species of beetle

Prosoplus viduatus is a species of beetle in the family Cerambycidae. It was described by Francis Polkinghorne Pascoe in 1864. It is known from Moluccas.
