= Oopsis =

Scientific classification
- Kingdom: Animalia
- Phylum: Arthropoda
- Class: Insecta
- Order: Coleoptera
- Suborder: Polyphaga
- Infraorder: Cucujiformia
- Family: Cerambycidae
- Subfamily: Lamiinae
- Tribe: Apomecynini
- Genus: Oopsis; Fairmaire, 1850

Genus of beetles

Oopsis is a genus of beetles in the family Cerambycidae, containing the following species:

- Oopsis albopicta Aurivillius, 1928
- Oopsis bougainvillei Breuning, 1976
- Oopsis brenneocaudata Fairmaire, 1879
- Oopsis excavata Breuning, 1939
- Oopsis foudrasi (Montrouzier, 1861)
- Oopsis griseocaudata Fairmaire, 1881
- Oopsis keiensis Breuning, 1970
- Oopsis lycia Dillon & Dillon, 1952
- Oopsis marshallensis Gressitt, 1956
- Oopsis nutator (Fabricius, 1787)
- Oopsis oblongipennis Fairmaire, 1850
- Oopsis postmaculata Breuning, 1939
- Oopsis ropicoides Breuning, 1939
- Oopsis striatella Fairmaire, 1879
- Oopsis uvua Dillon & Dillon, 1952
- Oopsis variivestris Fairmaire, 1879
- Oopsis velata Dillon & Dillon, 1952
- Oopsis zitja Dillon & Dillon, 1952
