= Xavier Montrouzier =

French scientist

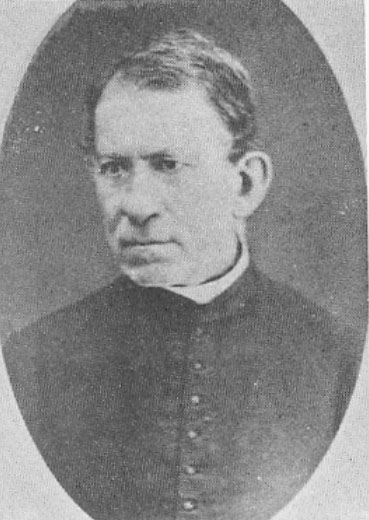
Xavier Montrouzier (1820–1897)

Reverendus Pater Jean Xavier Hyacinthe Montrouzier (3 December 1820 – 6 May 1897) was a French Marist priest, explorer, botanist, zoologist and entomologist. Abbé Montrouzier studied the flora and fauna of Melanesia especially New Caledonia.

== Works ==
- Montrouzier, P. 1855. Essai sur la faune de l'île de Woodlark ou Mouiou. Annales de la Société d'Agriculture de Lyon 2 7: 1–114

== Honours ==
Plants named for him include:

- the genus Montrouziera "houp" (Clusiaceae)
- (Euphorbiaceae) Phyllanthus montrouzieri Guillaumin & Guillaumin
- (Lecythidaceae) Barringtonia montrouzieri Vieill.
- (Meliaceae) Aglaia montrouzieri Pierre ex Pellegr.

Animals named for him include:

- Papilio montrouzieri, Montrouzier's Ulysses, a swallowtail butterfly.
- The mealybug destroyer, Cryptolaemus montrouzieri
