= Lepturonota tristis =

Scientific classification
- Domain: Eukaryota
- Kingdom: Animalia
- Phylum: Arthropoda
- Class: Insecta
- Order: Coleoptera
- Suborder: Polyphaga
- Infraorder: Cucujiformia
- Family: Cerambycidae
- Subfamily: Lamiinae
- Tribe: Enicodini
- Genus: Lepturonota
- Species: L. tristis

Binomial name
- Lepturonota tristis ( Montrouzier, 1861)

Synonyms
- Leptonota tristis Montrouzier, 1861; Lepturonota tristis m. transversefasciata Breuning, 1978

Species of beetle

Lepturonota tristis is a species of beetle in the family Cerambycidae. It was described by Xavier Montrouzier in 1861, originally under the genus Leptonota.

This species is found in New Caledonia on Balade and Art Islands.

== Varieties ==
- Lepturonota tristis var. aenea (Montrouzier, 1861)
- Lepturonota tristis var. albovittata Fauvel, 1862
- Lepturonota tristis var. chalybaea Lepesme & Breuning, 1953
- Lepturonota tristis var. ruficollis (Fauvel, 1906)
