= Lepturonota inconspicua =

Scientific classification
- Domain: Eukaryota
- Kingdom: Animalia
- Phylum: Arthropoda
- Class: Insecta
- Order: Coleoptera
- Suborder: Polyphaga
- Infraorder: Cucujiformia
- Family: Cerambycidae
- Subfamily: Lamiinae
- Tribe: Enicodini
- Genus: Lepturonota
- Species: L. inconspicua

Binomial name
- Lepturonota inconspicua ( Montrouzier, 1861)

Species of beetle

Lepturonota inconspicua is a species of beetle in the family Cerambycidae. It is found in New Caledonia on the islands of Art, Lifou, and the Isle of Pines

This species was described by Xavier Montrouzier in 1861.
