= Mimenicodes fractimacula =

Scientific classification
- Domain: Eukaryota
- Kingdom: Animalia
- Phylum: Arthropoda
- Class: Insecta
- Order: Coleoptera
- Suborder: Polyphaga
- Infraorder: Cucujiformia
- Family: Cerambycidae
- Tribe: Enicodini
- Genus: Mimenicodes
- Species: M. fractimacula

Binomial name
- Mimenicodes fractimacula (Fauvel, 1906)

Synonyms
- Enicodes fractimacula Fauvel, 1906

Species of beetle

Mimenicodes fractimacula is a species of beetle in the family Cerambycidae. It was described by Fauvel in 1906. It is known from New Caledonia.
