= Lepturonota lifuana =

Scientific classification
- Domain: Eukaryota
- Kingdom: Animalia
- Phylum: Arthropoda
- Class: Insecta
- Order: Coleoptera
- Suborder: Polyphaga
- Infraorder: Cucujiformia
- Family: Cerambycidae
- Subfamily: Lamiinae
- Tribe: Enicodini
- Genus: Lepturonota
- Species: L. lifuana

Binomial name
- Lepturonota lifuana ( Montrouzier, 1861)

Species of beetle

Lepturonota lifuana is a species of beetle in the family Cerambycidae, found in New Caledonia on the island of Lifou.

It was described by Xavier Montrouzier in 1861.
