= Mimenicodes granulum =

Scientific classification
- Domain: Eukaryota
- Kingdom: Animalia
- Phylum: Arthropoda
- Class: Insecta
- Order: Coleoptera
- Suborder: Polyphaga
- Infraorder: Cucujiformia
- Family: Cerambycidae
- Tribe: Enicodini
- Genus: Mimenicodes
- Species: M. granulum

Binomial name
- Mimenicodes granulum (Fauvel, 1906)

Synonyms
- Enicodes granulum Fauvel, 1906; Mimenicodes granulenicodes granulum Cools, 1993

Species of beetle

Mimenicodes granulum is a species of beetle in the family Cerambycidae. It was described by Fauvel in 1906. It is known from New Caledonia.
