= Nemaschema chlorizans =

Scientific classification
- Domain: Eukaryota
- Kingdom: Animalia
- Phylum: Arthropoda
- Class: Insecta
- Order: Coleoptera
- Suborder: Polyphaga
- Infraorder: Cucujiformia
- Family: Cerambycidae
- Tribe: Enicodini
- Genus: Nemaschema
- Species: N. chlorizans

Binomial name
- Nemaschema chlorizans Fauvel, 1906

Species of beetle

Nemaschema chlorizans is a species of beetle in the family Cerambycidae. It was described by Fauvel in 1906.
