= Toxotomimus baladicus =

Scientific classification
- Domain: Eukaryota
- Kingdom: Animalia
- Phylum: Arthropoda
- Class: Insecta
- Order: Coleoptera
- Suborder: Polyphaga
- Infraorder: Cucujiformia
- Family: Cerambycidae
- Tribe: Enicodini
- Genus: Toxotomimus
- Species: T. baladicus

Binomial name
- Toxotomimus baladicus (Montrouzier, 1861)

Synonyms
- Zygocera baladica Fauvel, 1906

Species of beetle

Toxotomimus baladicus is a species of beetle in the family Cerambycidae. It was described by Xavier Montrouzier in 1861.
