= Mimenicodes perroudi =

Scientific classification
- Domain: Eukaryota
- Kingdom: Animalia
- Phylum: Arthropoda
- Class: Insecta
- Order: Coleoptera
- Suborder: Polyphaga
- Infraorder: Cucujiformia
- Family: Cerambycidae
- Tribe: Enicodini
- Genus: Mimenicodes
- Species: M. perroudi

Binomial name
- Mimenicodes perroudi (Montrouzier, 1861)

Synonyms
- Enicodes perroudi Montrouzier, 1861; Mimenicodes granulenicodes perroudi Cools, 1993

Species of beetle

Mimenicodes perroudi is a species of beetle in the family Cerambycidae. It was described by Xavier Montrouzier in 1861. It is known from New Caledonia.
