= Lepturonota loyaltiana =

Scientific classification
- Kingdom: Animalia
- Phylum: Arthropoda
- Class: Insecta
- Order: Coleoptera
- Suborder: Polyphaga
- Infraorder: Cucujiformia
- Family: Cerambycidae
- Subfamily: Lamiinae
- Tribe: Enicodini
- Genus: Lepturonota
- Species: L. loyaltiana

Binomial name
- Lepturonota loyaltiana Breuning, 1953

Species of beetle

Lepturonota loyaltiana is a species of longhorned beetle in the family Cerambycidae, found in New Caledonia on Loyalty Island.

It was described by Stephan von Breuning in 1953.
