= Nemaschema baladicum =

Scientific classification
- Domain: Eukaryota
- Kingdom: Animalia
- Phylum: Arthropoda
- Class: Insecta
- Order: Coleoptera
- Suborder: Polyphaga
- Infraorder: Cucujiformia
- Family: Cerambycidae
- Tribe: Enicodini
- Genus: Nemaschema
- Species: N. baladicum

Binomial name
- Nemaschema baladicum (Montrouzier, 1861)

Species of beetle

Nemaschema baladicum is a species of beetle in the family Cerambycidae. It was described by Xavier Montrouzier in 1861.
