= Nemaschema sanguinicolle =

Scientific classification
- Domain: Eukaryota
- Kingdom: Animalia
- Phylum: Arthropoda
- Class: Insecta
- Order: Coleoptera
- Suborder: Polyphaga
- Infraorder: Cucujiformia
- Family: Cerambycidae
- Tribe: Enicodini
- Genus: Nemaschema
- Species: N. sanguinicolle

Binomial name
- Nemaschema sanguinicolle (Chevrolat, 1858)

Species of beetle

Nemaschema sanguinicolle is a species of beetle in the family Cerambycidae. It was described by Louis Alexandre Auguste Chevrolat in 1858.
