= Leptenicodes =

Scientific classification
- Kingdom: Animalia
- Phylum: Arthropoda
- Class: Insecta
- Order: Coleoptera
- Suborder: Polyphaga
- Infraorder: Cucujiformia
- Family: Cerambycidae
- Tribe: Enicodini
- Genus: Leptenicodes

Genus of beetles

Leptenicodes is a genus of longhorn beetles of the subfamily Lamiinae, containing the following species:

- Leptenicodes gracilis (Fauvel, 1906)
- Leptenicodes quadrilineatus Breuning, 1953
