= Dicra insignicornis =

Scientific classification
- Kingdom: Animalia
- Phylum: Arthropoda
- Class: Insecta
- Order: Coleoptera
- Suborder: Polyphaga
- Infraorder: Cucujiformia
- Family: Cerambycidae
- Genus: Dicra
- Species: D. insignicornis

Binomial name
- Dicra insignicornis Fauvel, 1906

Species of beetle

Dicra insignicornis is a species of beetle in the family Cerambycidae. It was described by Fauvel in 1906.
