= Leptonota comitessa =

Scientific classification
- Kingdom: Animalia
- Phylum: Arthropoda
- Class: Insecta
- Order: Coleoptera
- Suborder: Polyphaga
- Infraorder: Cucujiformia
- Family: Cerambycidae
- Genus: Leptonota
- Species: L. comitessa

Binomial name
- Leptonota comitessa (White, 1855)

Species of beetle

Leptonota comitessa is a species of beetle in the family Cerambycidae. It was described by White in 1855.
