= Toxotomimus =

Scientific classification
- Domain: Eukaryota
- Kingdom: Animalia
- Phylum: Arthropoda
- Class: Insecta
- Order: Coleoptera
- Suborder: Polyphaga
- Infraorder: Cucujiformia
- Family: Cerambycidae
- Tribe: Enicodini
- Genus: Toxotomimus

Genus of beetles

Toxotomimus is a genus of longhorn beetles of the subfamily Lamiinae, containing the following species:

- Toxotomimus baladicus (Montrouzier, 1861)
- Toxotomimus fasciolatus (Fauvel, 1906)
