= Enicodes =

Scientific classification
- Kingdom: Animalia
- Phylum: Arthropoda
- Class: Insecta
- Order: Coleoptera
- Suborder: Polyphaga
- Infraorder: Cucujiformia
- Family: Cerambycidae
- Tribe: Enicodini
- Genus: Enicodes

Genus of beetles

Enicodes is a genus of longhorn beetles of the subfamily Lamiinae, containing the following species:

- Enicodes fichteli (Schreibers, 1902)
- Enicodes montrouzieri Montrouzier, 1861
- Enicodes schreibersii Thomson, 1865
