= Nemaschema =

Scientific classification
- Domain: Eukaryota
- Kingdom: Animalia
- Phylum: Arthropoda
- Class: Insecta
- Order: Coleoptera
- Suborder: Polyphaga
- Infraorder: Cucujiformia
- Family: Cerambycidae
- Tribe: Enicodini
- Genus: Nemaschema

Genus of beetles

Nemaschema is a genus of longhorn beetles of the subfamily Lamiinae, containing the following species:

- Nemaschema baladicum (Montrouzier, 1861)
- Nemaschema chlorizans Fauvel, 1906
- Nemaschema collarti Breuning, 1958
- Nemaschema flavovittatum Breuning, 1976
- Nemaschema griseum Fauvel, 1906
- Nemaschema lamberti (Montrouzier, 1861)
- Nemaschema limbicolle (Fauvel, 1906)
- Nemaschema lineatum Fauvel, 1906
- Nemaschema macilentum Fauvel, 1906
- Nemaschema mulsanti Perroud, 1864
- Nemaschema nitidulum Fauvel, 1906
- Nemaschema ochreovittatum Breuning, 1978
- Nemaschema olivaceum Breuning, 1950
- Nemaschema parteflavoantennatum Breuning, 1969
- Nemaschema puberulum (Montrouzier, 1861)
- Nemaschema quadrisulcatum Breuning, 1940
- Nemaschema sanguinicolle (Chevrolat, 1858)
- Nemaschema viridipes (Fauvel, 1906)
