= Leptonota sepium =

Scientific classification
- Kingdom: Animalia
- Phylum: Arthropoda
- Class: Insecta
- Order: Coleoptera
- Suborder: Polyphaga
- Infraorder: Cucujiformia
- Family: Cerambycidae
- Genus: Leptonota
- Species: L. sepium

Binomial name
- Leptonota sepium Montrouzier, 1861

Species of beetle

Leptonota sepium is a species of beetle in the family Cerambycidae. It was described by Xavier Montrouzier in 1861.
