= Mimenicodes =

Scientific classification
- Domain: Eukaryota
- Kingdom: Animalia
- Phylum: Arthropoda
- Class: Insecta
- Order: Coleoptera
- Suborder: Polyphaga
- Infraorder: Cucujiformia
- Family: Cerambycidae
- Tribe: Enicodini
- Genus: Mimenicodes

Genus of beetles

Mimenicodes is a genus of longhorn beetles of the subfamily Lamiinae, containing the following species:

subgenus Granulenicodes

- Mimenicodes granulum (Fauvel, 1906)
- Mimenicodes perroudi (Montrouzier, 1861)

subgenus Mimenicodes

- Mimenicodes aureovitta Breuning, 1953
- Mimenicodes bougieri (Fauvel, 1906)
- Mimenicodes cohici Lepesme & Breuning, 1953
- Mimenicodes cylindricus (Fauvel, 1906)
- Mimenicodes cylindroides Breuning, 1940
- Mimenicodes flavolineatus Breuning, 1978
- Mimenicodes fractimacula (Fauvel, 1906)
- Mimenicodes latreillei (Fauvel, 1906)
- Mimenicodes obliquatus Breuning, 1942
- Mimenicodes opacoides Breuning, 1982
- Mimenicodes opacus (Fauvel, 1906)
- Mimenicodes rugiceps (Fauvel, 1906)
- Mimenicodes scripticollis (Fauvel, 1906)
- Mimenicodes subunicolor Breuning, 1973
- Mimenicodes thomsoni (Fauvel, 1906)
- Mimenicodes unicolor Breuning, 1940
