= Otenis chalybaea =

Scientific classification
- Domain: Eukaryota
- Kingdom: Animalia
- Phylum: Arthropoda
- Class: Insecta
- Order: Coleoptera
- Suborder: Polyphaga
- Infraorder: Cucujiformia
- Family: Cerambycidae
- Genus: Otenis
- Species: O. chalybaea

Binomial name
- Otenis chalybaea Heller, 1917

Species of beetle

Otenis chalybaea is a species of beetle in the family Cerambycidae. It was described by Heller in 1917.
