= Leptenicodes gracilis =

Scientific classification
- Kingdom: Animalia
- Phylum: Arthropoda
- Class: Insecta
- Order: Coleoptera
- Suborder: Polyphaga
- Infraorder: Cucujiformia
- Family: Cerambycidae
- Genus: Leptenicodes
- Species: L. gracilis

Binomial name
- Leptenicodes gracilis (Fauvel, 1906)

Synonyms
- Enicodes gracilis Fauvel, 1906

Species of beetle

Leptenicodes gracilis is a species of beetle in the family Cerambycidae. It was described by Fauvel in 1906.
