= Anomonotes annulipes =

Scientific classification
- Domain: Eukaryota
- Kingdom: Animalia
- Phylum: Arthropoda
- Class: Insecta
- Order: Coleoptera
- Suborder: Polyphaga
- Infraorder: Cucujiformia
- Family: Cerambycidae
- Genus: Anomonotes
- Species: A. annulipes

Binomial name
- Anomonotes annulipes Heller, 1917

Synonyms
- Micronotes annulipes Heller, 1917

Species of beetle

Anomonotes annulipes is a species of beetle in the family Cerambycidae. It was described by Heller in 1917. It is known from New Caledonia.
