= Anomonotes leucomerus =

Scientific classification
- Domain: Eukaryota
- Kingdom: Animalia
- Phylum: Arthropoda
- Class: Insecta
- Order: Coleoptera
- Suborder: Polyphaga
- Infraorder: Cucujiformia
- Family: Cerambycidae
- Genus: Anomonotes
- Species: A. leucomerus

Binomial name
- Anomonotes leucomerus Heller, 1917

Species of beetle

Anomonotes leucomerus is a species of beetle in the family Cerambycidae. It was described by Heller in 1917. It is known from New Caledonia.
