= Lepturonota =

Scientific classification
- Kingdom: Animalia
- Phylum: Arthropoda
- Class: Insecta
- Order: Coleoptera
- Suborder: Polyphaga
- Infraorder: Cucujiformia
- Family: Cerambycidae
- Subfamily: Lamiinae
- Tribe: Enicodini
- Genus: Lepturonota; Breuning, 1953

Genus of beetles

Lepturonota is a genus of flat-faced longhorns in the beetle family Cerambycidae. There are about five described species in Lepturonota, found in New Caledonia.

== Species ==
These five species belong to the genus Lepturonota:

- Lepturonota inconspicua (Montrouzier, 1861) New Caledonia (Art, Lifou, Isle of Pines)
- Lepturonota lifuana (Montrouzier, 1861) New Caledonia (Lifou)
- Lepturonota loyaltiana Breuning, 1953 New Caledonia (Loyalty Island)
- Lepturonota modesta (Montrouzier, 1861) New Caledonia (Lifou)
- Lepturonota tristis (Montrouzier, 1861) New Caledonia (Balade, Art)
