= Dicra =

Scientific classification
- Kingdom: Animalia
- Phylum: Arthropoda
- Class: Insecta
- Order: Coleoptera
- Suborder: Polyphaga
- Infraorder: Cucujiformia
- Family: Cerambycidae
- Tribe: Enicodini
- Genus: Dicra

Genus of beetles

Dicra is a genus of longhorn beetles of the subfamily Lamiinae, containing the following species:

- Dicra insignicornis Fauvel, 1906
- Dicra nodicornis Fauvel, 1906
