= Enotes (beetle) =

Scientific classification
- Domain: Eukaryota
- Kingdom: Animalia
- Phylum: Arthropoda
- Class: Insecta
- Order: Coleoptera
- Suborder: Polyphaga
- Infraorder: Cucujiformia
- Family: Cerambycidae
- Tribe: Enicodini
- Genus: Enotes; Thomson, 1864
- Species: E. lifuanus

Binomial name
- Enotes lifuanus (Montrouzier, 1861)

Synonyms
- Enotes montrouzieri (Thomson, 1864)

Genus of beetles

Enotes is a genus of flat-faced longhorns in the beetle family Cerambycidae. This genus has a single species, Enotes lifuanus, found in New Caledonia.

The species Enotes lifuanus was described by Xavier Montrouzier in 1861.
