= Anomonotes =

Scientific classification
- Domain: Eukaryota
- Kingdom: Animalia
- Phylum: Arthropoda
- Class: Insecta
- Order: Coleoptera
- Suborder: Polyphaga
- Infraorder: Cucujiformia
- Family: Cerambycidae
- Subfamily: Lamiinae
- Tribe: Enicodini
- Genus: Anomonotes; Heller, 1917

Genus of beetles

Anomonotes is a genus of longhorn beetles of the subfamily Lamiinae, containing the following species:

- Anomonotes annulipes Heller, 1917
- Anomonotes leucomerus Heller, 1917
