= Enicodes montrouzieri =

Scientific classification
- Kingdom: Animalia
- Phylum: Arthropoda
- Class: Insecta
- Order: Coleoptera
- Suborder: Polyphaga
- Infraorder: Cucujiformia
- Family: Cerambycidae
- Genus: Enicodes
- Species: E. montrouzieri

Binomial name
- Enicodes montrouzieri Montrouzier, 1861

Synonyms
- Enicodes tapeinodes Thomson, 1865

Species of beetle

Enicodes montrouzieri is a species of beetle in the family Cerambycidae. It was described by Xavier Montrouzier in 1861. It is known from New Caledonia. It feeds on Coffea arabica and Coffea canephora.
