= Enicodes schreibersii =

Scientific classification
- Kingdom: Animalia
- Phylum: Arthropoda
- Class: Insecta
- Order: Coleoptera
- Suborder: Polyphaga
- Infraorder: Cucujiformia
- Family: Cerambycidae
- Genus: Enicodes
- Species: E. schreibersii

Binomial name
- Enicodes schreibersii Thomson, 1865

Synonyms
- Enicodes kaszabi Breuning, 1978; Enicodes sarasini Heller, 1917

Species of beetle

Enicodes schreibersii is a species of beetle in the family Cerambycidae. It was described by Thomson in 1865. It is known from New Caledonia. It feeds on the breadfruit tree.
