= Mimenicodes cohici =

Scientific classification
- Kingdom: Animalia
- Phylum: Arthropoda
- Class: Insecta
- Order: Coleoptera
- Suborder: Polyphaga
- Infraorder: Cucujiformia
- Family: Cerambycidae
- Genus: Mimenicodes
- Species: M. cohici

Binomial name
- Mimenicodes cohici Lepesme & Breuning, 1953

Species of beetle

Mimenicodes cohici is a species of beetle in the family Cerambycidae. It was described by Lepesme and Stephan von Breuning in 1953. It is known from New Caledonia.
