= Enicodes fichteli =

Scientific classification
- Kingdom: Animalia
- Phylum: Arthropoda
- Class: Insecta
- Order: Coleoptera
- Suborder: Polyphaga
- Infraorder: Cucujiformia
- Family: Cerambycidae
- Genus: Enicodes
- Species: E. fichteli

Binomial name
- Enicodes fichteli (Schreibers, 1902)

Synonyms
- Cerambix fichteli Schreibers, 1902

Species of beetle

Enicodes fichteli is a species of beetle in the family Cerambycidae. It was described by Schreibers in 1902. It is known from New Caledonia and Australia.
