= Paraenicodes =

Scientific classification
- Kingdom: Animalia
- Phylum: Arthropoda
- Class: Insecta
- Order: Coleoptera
- Suborder: Polyphaga
- Infraorder: Cucujiformia
- Family: Cerambycidae
- Genus: Paraenicodes
- Species: P. annulifer

Binomial name
- Paraenicodes annulifer (Fauvel, 1906)

Genus of beetles

Paraenicodes annulifer is a species of beetle in the family Cerambycidae, and the only species in the genus Paraenicodes. It was described by Fauvel in 1906.
