= Scabroschema =

Scientific classification
- Kingdom: Animalia
- Phylum: Arthropoda
- Class: Insecta
- Order: Coleoptera
- Suborder: Polyphaga
- Infraorder: Cucujiformia
- Family: Cerambycidae
- Genus: Scabroschema
- Species: S. scabricolle

Binomial name
- Scabroschema scabricolle (Fauvel, 1906)

Genus of beetles

Scabroschema scabricolle is a species of beetle in the family Cerambycidae, and the only species in the genus Scabroschema. It was described by Fauvel in 1906.
