= Lepturoschema =

Scientific classification
- Kingdom: Animalia
- Phylum: Arthropoda
- Class: Insecta
- Order: Coleoptera
- Suborder: Polyphaga
- Infraorder: Cucujiformia
- Family: Cerambycidae
- Genus: Lepturoschema
- Species: L. penardi

Binomial name
- Lepturoschema penardi (Montrouzier, 1861)

Genus of beetles

Lepturoschema penardi is a species of beetle in the family Cerambycidae, and the only species in the genus Lepturoschema. Lepturoschema penardi was described by Xavier Montrouzier in 1861.
