= Enotoschema =

Scientific classification
- Kingdom: Animalia
- Phylum: Arthropoda
- Class: Insecta
- Order: Coleoptera
- Suborder: Polyphaga
- Infraorder: Cucujiformia
- Family: Cerambycidae
- Genus: Enotoschema
- Species: E. sericans

Binomial name
- Enotoschema sericans Breuning, 1953

Genus of beetles

Enotoschema sericans is a species of beetle in the family Cerambycidae, and the only species in the genus Enotoschema. It was described by Breuning in 1953.
