= Cephalenicodes =

Scientific classification
- Kingdom: Animalia
- Phylum: Arthropoda
- Class: Insecta
- Order: Coleoptera
- Suborder: Polyphaga
- Infraorder: Cucujiformia
- Family: Cerambycidae
- Genus: Cephalenicodes
- Species: C. bimaculatus

Binomial name
- Cephalenicodes bimaculatus (Fauvel, 1906)

Genus of beetles

Cephalenicodes bimaculatus is a species of beetle in the family Cerambycidae, and the only species in the genus Cephalenicodes. It was described by Fauvel in 1906.
