= Granulenotes =

Scientific classification
- Kingdom: Animalia
- Phylum: Arthropoda
- Class: Insecta
- Order: Coleoptera
- Suborder: Polyphaga
- Infraorder: Cucujiformia
- Family: Cerambycidae
- Genus: Granulenotes
- Species: G. granulipennis

Binomial name
- Granulenotes granulipennis Breuning, 1969

Genus of beetles

Granulenotes granulipennis is a species of beetle in the family Cerambycidae, and the only species in the genus Granulenotes. It was described by Breuning in 1969.
