= Leptaschema =

Scientific classification
- Kingdom: Animalia
- Phylum: Arthropoda
- Class: Insecta
- Order: Coleoptera
- Suborder: Polyphaga
- Infraorder: Cucujiformia
- Family: Cerambycidae
- Genus: Leptaschema
- Species: L. filarium

Binomial name
- Leptaschema filarium (Fauvel, 1906)

Genus of beetles

Leptaschema filarium is a species of beetle in the family Cerambycidae, and the only species in the genus Leptaschema. It was described by Fauvel in 1906.
