= Enotogenes =

Scientific classification
- Kingdom: Animalia
- Phylum: Arthropoda
- Class: Insecta
- Order: Coleoptera
- Suborder: Polyphaga
- Infraorder: Cucujiformia
- Family: Cerambycidae
- Genus: Enotogenes
- Species: E. exiguus

Binomial name
- Enotogenes exiguus Heller, 1917

Genus of beetles

Enotogenes exiguus is a species of beetle in the family Cerambycidae, and the only species in the genus Enotogenes. It was described by Heller in 1917.
