= Falsenicodes =

Scientific classification
- Kingdom: Animalia
- Phylum: Arthropoda
- Class: Insecta
- Order: Coleoptera
- Suborder: Polyphaga
- Infraorder: Cucujiformia
- Family: Cerambycidae
- Genus: Falsenicodes
- Species: F. lineatus

Binomial name
- Falsenicodes lineatus Breuning, 1940

Genus of beetles

Falsenicodes lineatus is a species of beetle in the family Cerambycidae, and the only species in the genus Falsenicodes. It was described by Breuning in 1940.
