= Pulchrenicodes =

Scientific classification
- Kingdom: Animalia
- Phylum: Arthropoda
- Class: Insecta
- Order: Coleoptera
- Suborder: Polyphaga
- Infraorder: Cucujiformia
- Family: Cerambycidae
- Genus: Pulchrenicodes
- Species: P. univittatus

Binomial name
- Pulchrenicodes univittatus (Fauvel, 1906)

Genus of beetles

Pulchrenicodes univittatus is a species of beetle in the family Cerambycidae, and the only species in the genus Pulchrenicodes. It was described by Fauvel in 1906.
