= Leptonota =

Scientific classification
- Kingdom: Animalia
- Phylum: Arthropoda
- Class: Insecta
- Order: Coleoptera
- Suborder: Polyphaga
- Infraorder: Cucujiformia
- Family: Cerambycidae
- Tribe: Enicodini
- Genus: Leptonota

Genus of beetles

Leptonota is a genus of longhorn beetles of the subfamily Lamiinae, containing the following species:

- Leptonota comitessa (White, 1855)
- Leptonota sepium Montrouzier, 1861
