= Enicodini =

Scientific classification
- Kingdom: Animalia
- Phylum: Arthropoda
- Class: Insecta
- Order: Coleoptera
- Suborder: Polyphaga
- Infraorder: Cucujiformia
- Family: Cerambycidae
- Subfamily: Lamiinae
- Tribe: Enicodini; Thomson, 1860

Tribe of beetles

Enicodini is a tribe of longhorn beetles of the subfamily Lamiinae. It was described by Thomson in 1860.

== Taxonomy ==
- Anomonotes Heller, 1917
- Cephalenicodes Breuning, 1953
- Clavenicodes Breuning, 1953
- Dicra Fauvel, 1906
- Enicodes Thomson, 1860
- Enotes Thomson, 1864
- Enotogenes Heller, 1917
- Enotoschema Breuning, 1953
- Falsenicodes Breuning, 1940
- Granulenotes Breuning, 1969
- Leptaschema Breuning, 1953
- Leptenicodes Breuning, 1953
- Leptonota Thomson, 1860
- Lepturonota Breuning, 1953
- Lepturoschema Heller, 1916
- Mimenicodes Breuning, 1940
- Nemaschema Thomson, 1860
- Otenis Heller, 1917
- Paraenicodes
- Pulchrenicodes Breuning, 1953
- Scabroschema Breuning, 1953
- Toxotomimus Heller, 1917
