= A. aequalis =

A. aequalis may refer to:

- Abra aequalis, a saltwater clam in the genus Abra
- Abrochia aequalis, a synonym of Pseudosphex aequalis, a moth found in Brazil
- Aediodes aequalis, a synonym of Piletocera aequalis, a moth found in New Guinea
- Aemene aequalis, a synonym of Eugoa aequalis, a moth found in Borneo, Malaysia, and Sumatra
- Aethalops aequalis, the Borneo fruit bat
- Agabus aequalis, a predaceous diving beetle found in Russia, China, and Mongolia
- Agrotis aequalis, a synonym of Euxoa aequalis, a moth found in Canada and the United States
- Alopecurus aequalis, a grass native to the temperate Northern Hemisphere
- Alpenus aequalis, a synonym of Alpenus maculosus, a moth found in Africa
- Apha aequalis, a moth found in Japan
- Aradus aequalis, a flat bug found in North America
- Astycus aequalis, a weevil found in Sri Lanka
