= Acaricoris =

Scientific classification
- Domain: Eukaryota
- Kingdom: Animalia
- Phylum: Arthropoda
- Class: Insecta
- Order: Hemiptera
- Suborder: Heteroptera
- Family: Aradidae
- Subfamily: Carventinae
- Genus: Acaricoris; Harris & Drake, 1944

Genus of true bugs

Acaricoris is a genus of flat bugs in the family Aradidae. There are about eight described species in Acaricoris.

== Species ==
These eight species belong to the genus Acaricoris:

- Acaricoris austeris Drake & Kormilev
- Acaricoris barroanus Drake & Kormilev
- Acaricoris clausus Drake & Kormilev
- Acaricoris dureti Kormilev
- Acaricoris floridus Drake, 1957
- Acaricoris haitiensis Kormilev
- Acaricoris ignotus Harris & Drake, 1944
- Acaricoris robertae Heiss & Poinar, 2012
