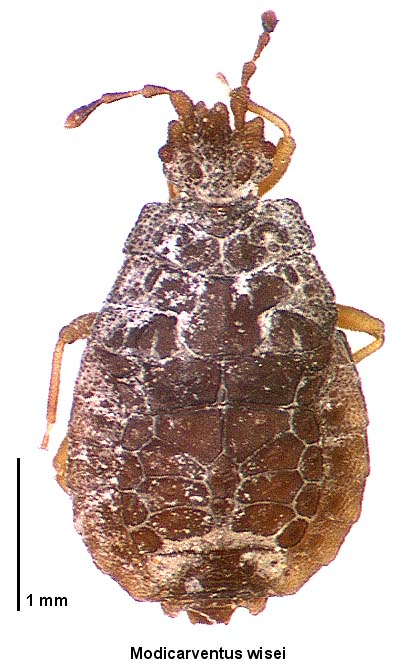
- Holotype of Modicarventus wisei from the Auckland War Memorial Museum

Scientific classification
- Kingdom: Animalia
- Phylum: Arthropoda
- Class: Insecta
- Order: Hemiptera
- Suborder: Heteroptera
- Family: Aradidae
- Genus: Modicarventus
- Species: M. wisei

Binomial name
- Modicarventus wisei Kirman, 1989

= Modicarventus wisei =

Species of true bug

Modicarventus wisei is a species of true bug belonging to the family Aradidae. The species is endemic to New Zealand, found in lowland broadleaf–podocarp forests of the Aupouri Peninsula of the Far North District.

== Description ==
M. wisei has a head which is wider across its eyes than it is long. The species is red-brown in colour. Males have a length of 2.45 mm (0.096 in) and a maximum width of 1.27 mm (0.050 in), while females have a length of 3.07 mm (0.121 in) and a width of 1.82 mm (0.072 in). Its body is broadly subovate, with males appearing almost rectangular, and females having a more pear-shaped body.

M. wisei can be distinguished from M. kirmani due to having a head shorter than long across its eyes, a thorax that moderately narrows on the anterior, by having rows of granules well defined across its entire body only on its pronotum (compared to M. kirmani, which has defined granules only on its pronotum), and by M. wisei tending to be slightly smaller.

== Taxonomy ==
The species was described by Maurice Kirman in 1989 as the type species of the genus Modicarventus, which he also described in the same paper. His description was based on a type specimen collected by K. A. J. Wise on 22 November 1967 from Unuwhao, near North Cape in the Far North District. The holotype is held by the Auckland War Memorial Museum. Kirman named the species in honour of K. A. J. Wise.

The species appears to be related to Neocarventus angulatus due to both species sharing similar thorax characteristics.

== Distribution and habitat ==
This species is endemic to New Zealand, and has been found on the Aupouri Peninsula of Northland Region, living in lowland broadleaf–podocarp forests. Type specimens have been collected from leaf litter forest remnants, including Unuwhao near North Cape, and Whareana. The Whareana specimen was collected from taraire leaf litter.

== Gallery ==
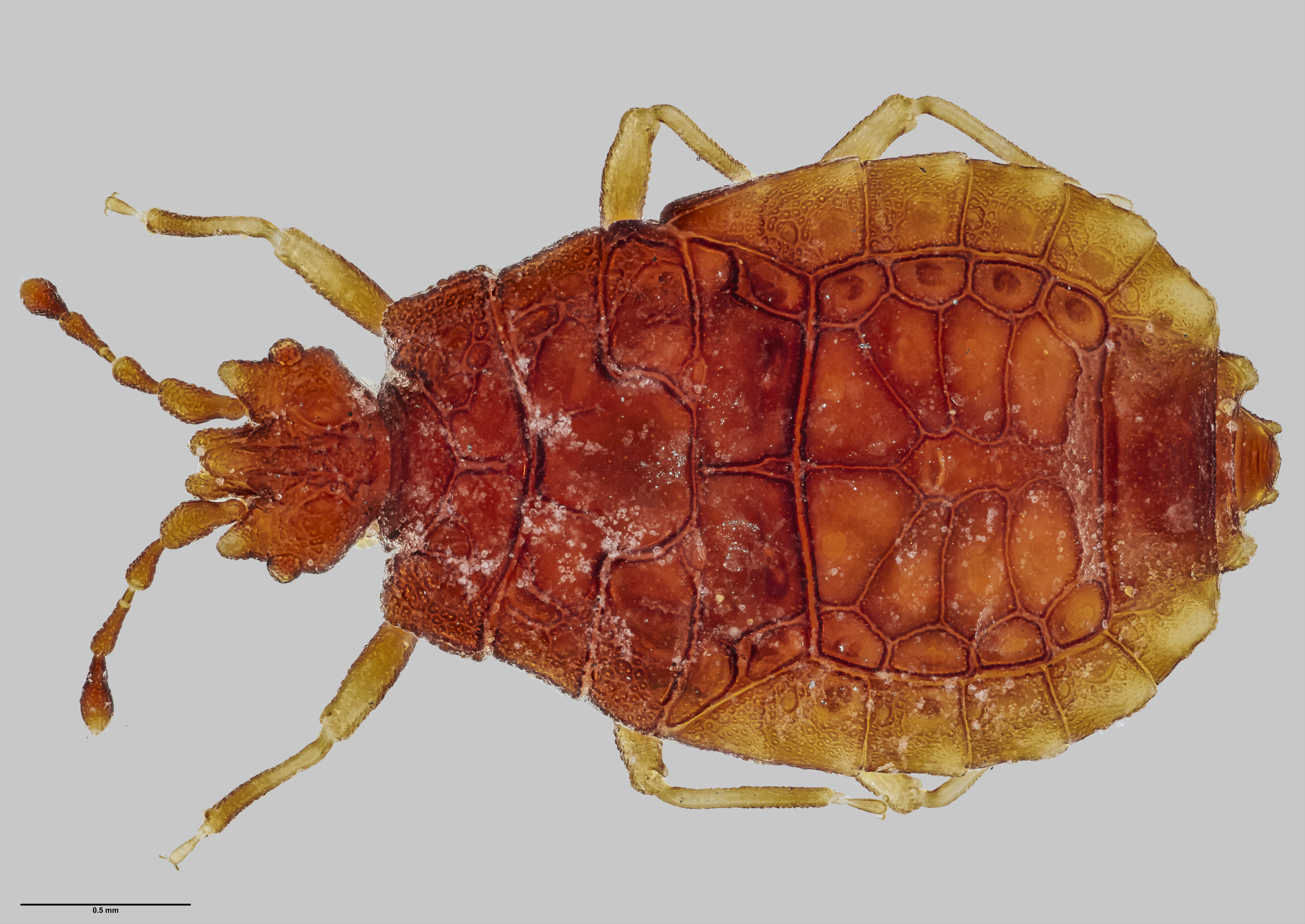
Holotype of M. wisei

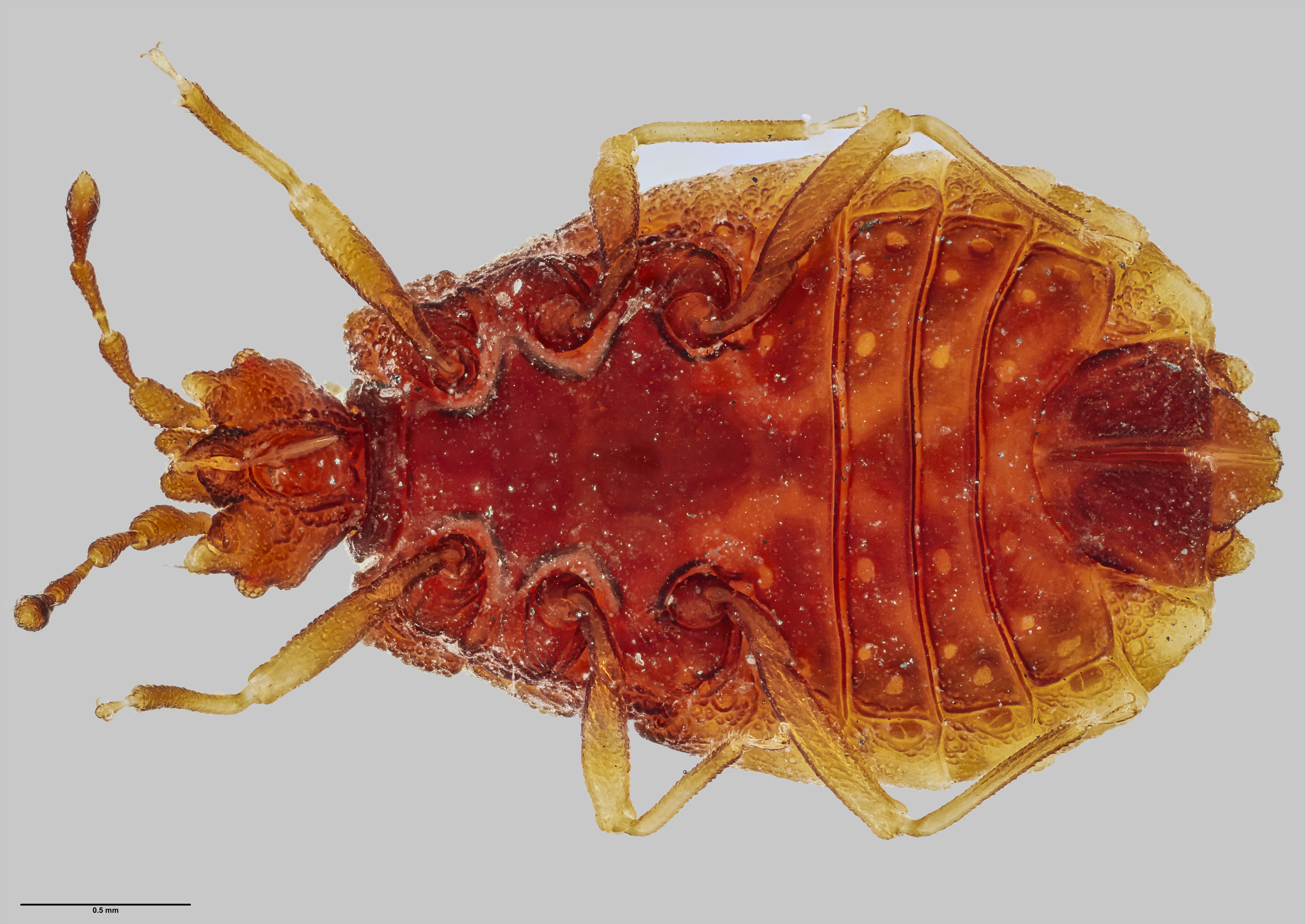
Underwise view of holotype

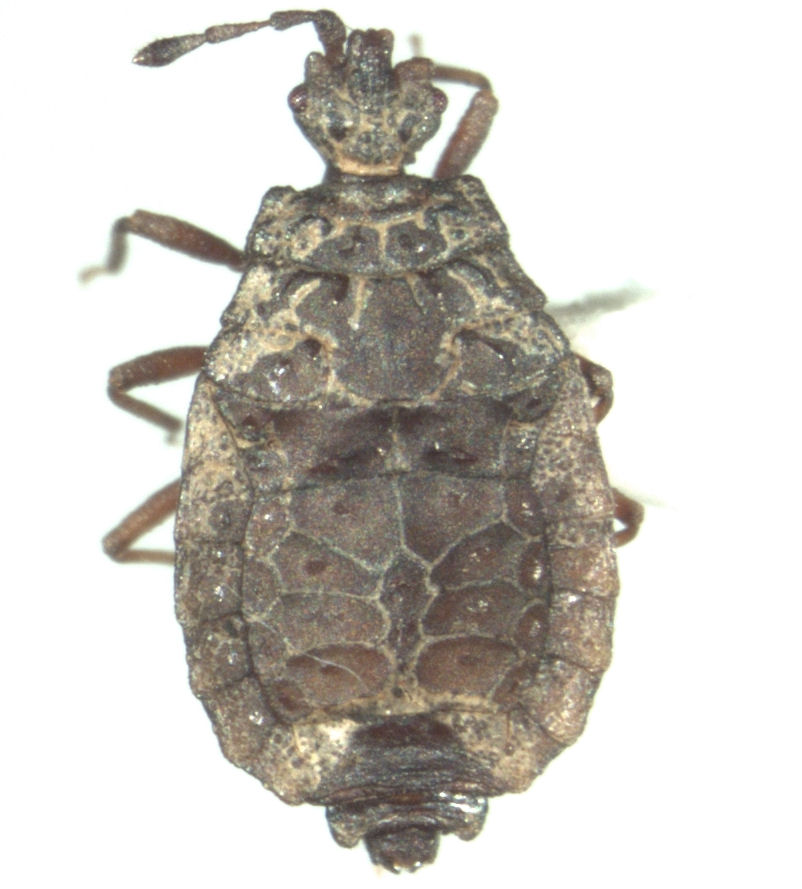
M. wisei photographed by Stephen Thorpe
