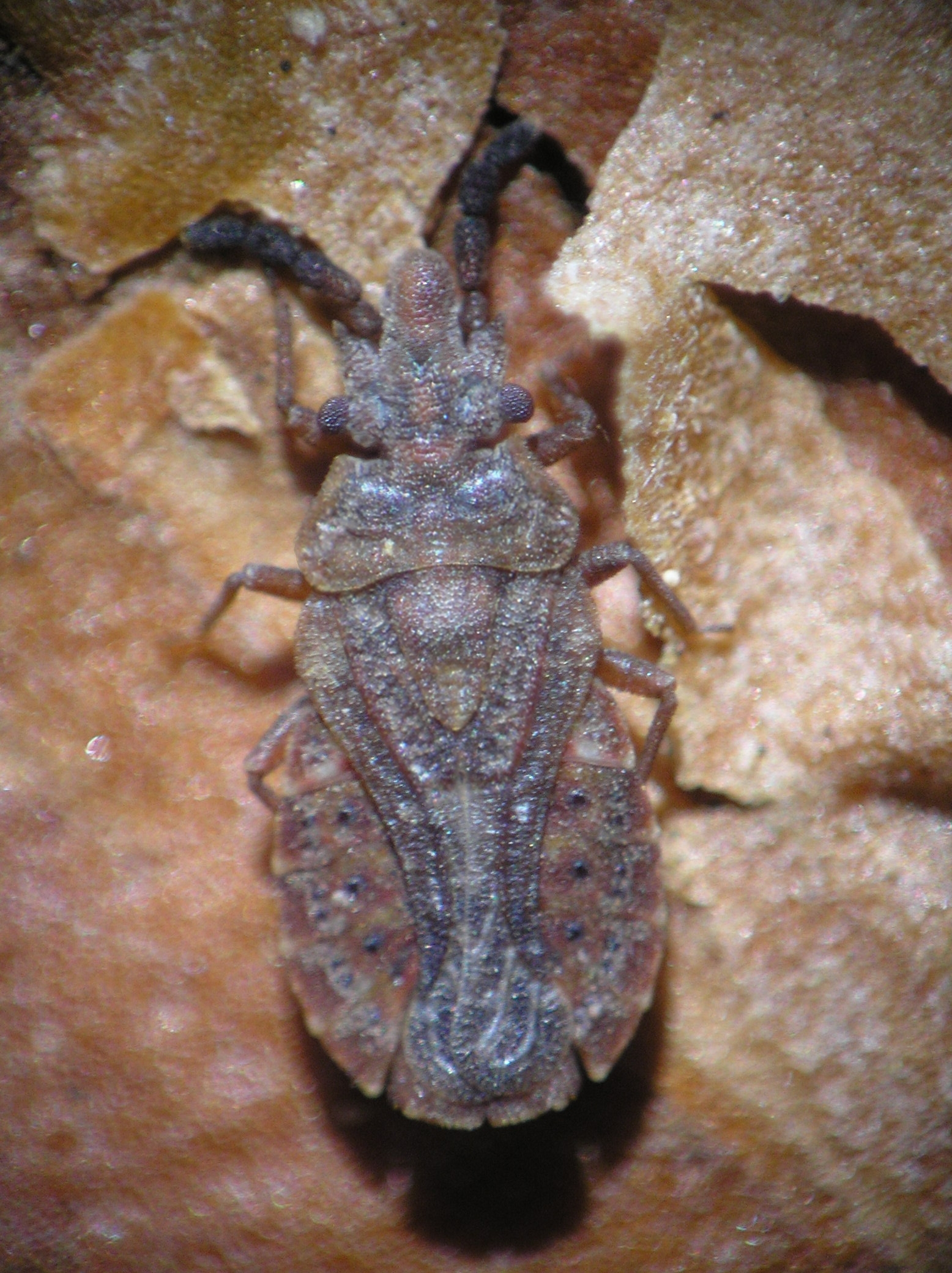
- Adult female Aradus cinnamomeus

Scientific classification
- Kingdom: Animalia
- Phylum: Arthropoda
- Clade: Pancrustacea
- Class: Insecta
- Order: Hemiptera
- Suborder: Heteroptera
- Family: Aradidae
- Subfamily: Aradinae
- Genus: Aradus; Fabricius, 1803

Species
- 200+, see text

= Aradus =

Aradus Temporal range: Aptian–Recent

Genus of true bugs

Aradus is a genus of true bugs in the family Aradidae, the flat bugs. It is distributed worldwide, mainly in the Holarctic. There are around 200 or more species in the genus.

Most Aradus feed on fungi, often in dead trees. Some species are pyrophilous, associating with burned habitat such as forests after wildfires. They feed on the particular fungi that grow on burnt wood. Examples include A. laeviusculus, which eats fungi growing on burned conifers, and A. gracilis, which occurs in large numbers on burned South Florida slash pine (Pinus elliottii var. densa).

Species include:

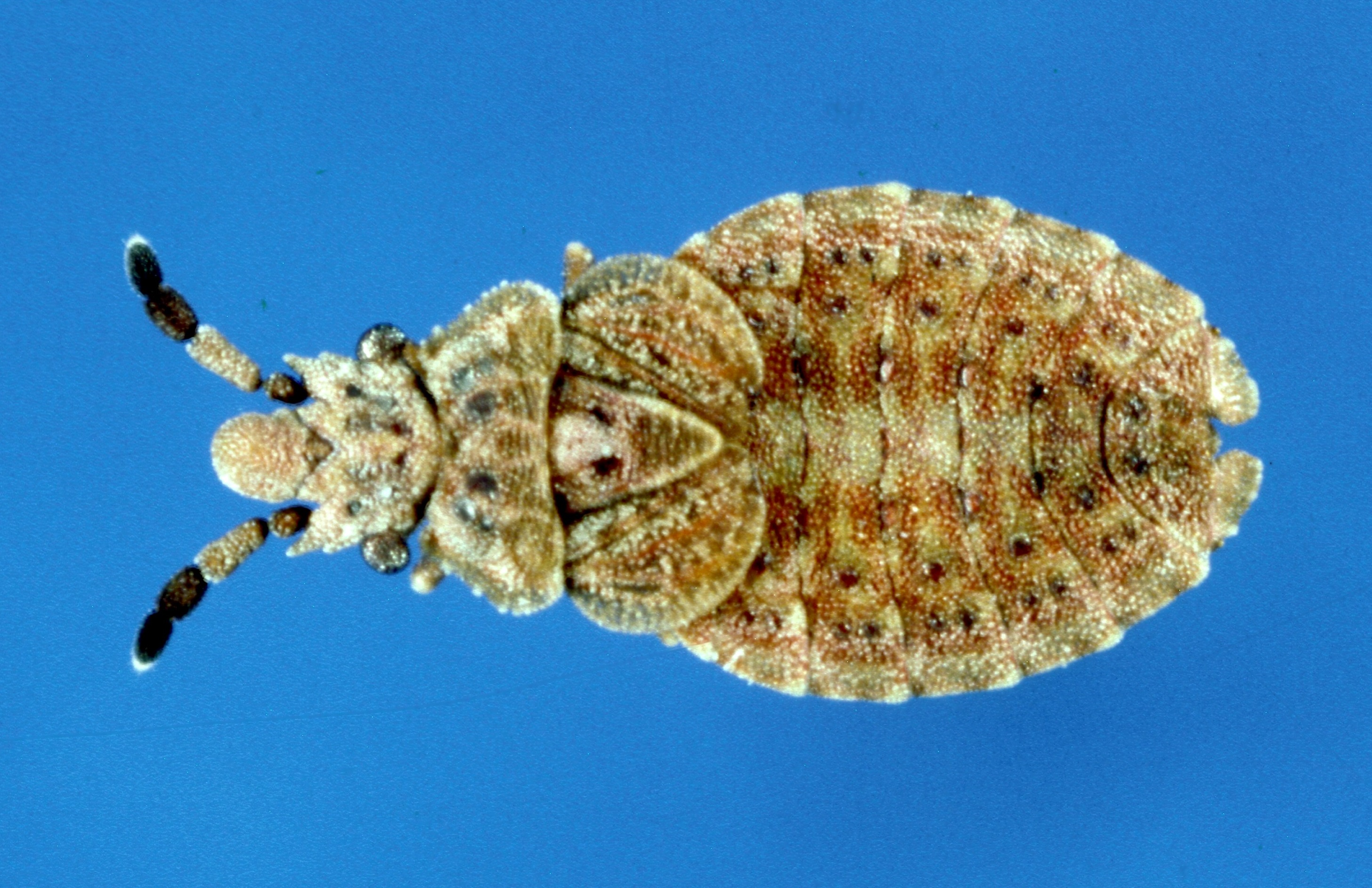
Aradus sp., adult

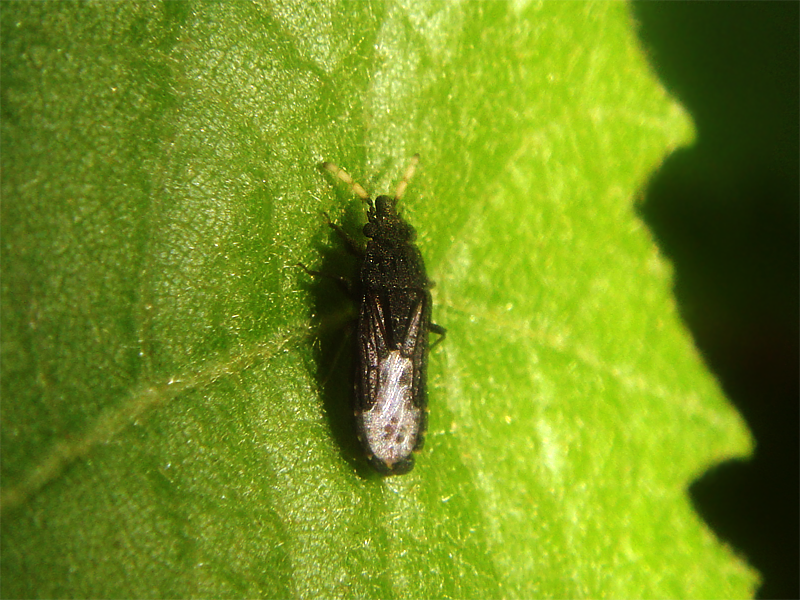
Aradus flavicornis

- Aradus abbas
- Aradus acutus
- Aradus aequalis
- Aradus alaskanus
- Aradus ampliatus
- Aradus antennalis
- Aradus apicalis
- Aradus approximatus
- Aradus arizonicus
- Aradus barberi
- Aradus basalis
- Aradus behrensi
- Aradus betulae
- Aradus blaisdelli
- Aradus borealis
- Aradus brenskei
- Aradus breviatus
- Aradus brevicornis
- Aradus brunnicornis
- Aradus carolinensis
- Aradus cincticornis
- Aradus coarctatus
- Aradus coloradensis
- Aradus compressus
- Aradus concinnus
- Aradus consors
- Aradus crenatus
- Aradus curticollis
- Aradus debilis
- Aradus depictus
- Aradus duzeei
- Aradus evermanni
- Aradus falleni
- Aradus flavicornis
- Aradus froeschneri
- Aradus funestus
- Aradus furnissi
- Aradus furvus
- Aradus fuscipennis
- Aradus fuscomaculatus
- Aradus gracilicornis
- Aradus gracilis
- Aradus hesperius
- Aradus implanus
- Aradus inornatus
- Aradus insignitus
- Aradus insolitus
- Aradus intectus
- Aradus intermedius
- Aradus kormilevi
- Aradus lawrencei
- Aradus leachi
- Aradus linsleyi
- Aradus lugubris
- Aradus marginatus
- Aradus medioximus
- Aradus montanus
- Aradus occidentalis
- Aradus opertaneus
- Aradus orbiculus
- Aradus oregonicus
- Aradus ornatus
- Aradus ovatus
- Aradus oviventris
- Aradus paganicus
- Aradus pannosus
- Aradus parshleyi
- Aradus parvicornis
- Aradus patibulus
- Aradus persimilis
- Aradus proboscideus
- Aradus quadrilineatus
- Aradus robustus
- Aradus saileri
- Aradus saskatchewanensis
- Aradus serratus
- Aradus shermani
- Aradus signaticornis
- Aradus similis
- Aradus snowi
- Aradus subruficeps
- Aradus taylori
- Aradus tuberculifer
- Aradus uniannulatus
- Aradus uniformis
- Aradus vadosus
- Aradus vandykei
