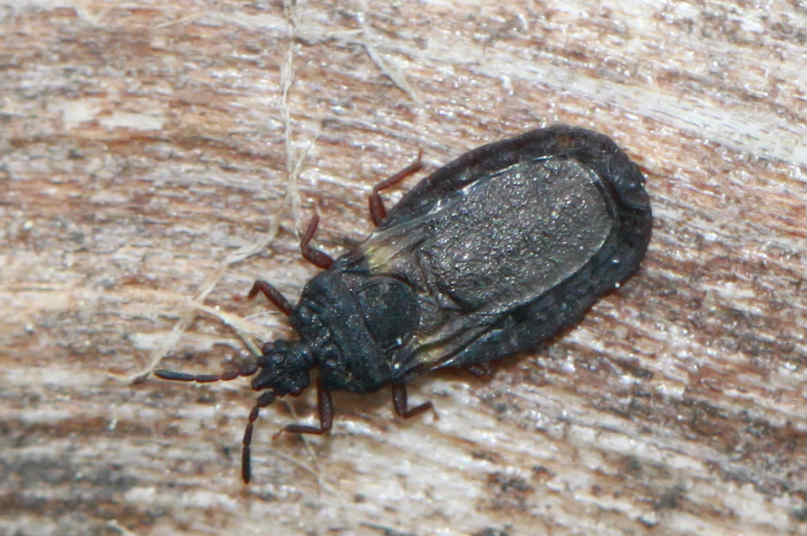
- Aneurus avenius or Aneurus laevis, Schwetzinger Hardt Forest Reserve, Germany

Scientific classification
- Domain: Eukaryota
- Kingdom: Animalia
- Phylum: Arthropoda
- Class: Insecta
- Order: Hemiptera
- Suborder: Heteroptera
- Family: Aradidae
- Subfamily: Aneurinae
- Genus: Aneurus; Curtis, 1825

= Aneurus =

Genus of true bugs

Aneurus is a genus of flat bugs in the family Aradidae. There are at least 60 described species in Aneurus.

== Species ==
These 60 species belong to the genus Aneurus:

- Aneurus albonitensis Kormilev
- Aneurus angustus Bergroth, 1914
- Aneurus arizonensis Picchi, 1977
- Aneurus avenius (Dufour, 1833)
- Aneurus barberi Kormilev
- Aneurus bispinosus Kormilev
- Aneurus bolivianus Kormilev
- Aneurus borealis Picchi, 1977
- Aneurus bosqui Kormilev
- Aneurus brevipennis Heiss, 1998
- Aneurus breviscutatus Bergroth, 1894
- Aneurus brouni Buchanan White, 1876
- Aneurus bucki Kormilev
- Aneurus championi Kormilev
- Aneurus costariquensis Kormilev, 1982
- Aneurus crenulatus Kormilev
- Aneurus deborahae Picchi, 1977
- Aneurus doesburgi Kormilev, 1974
- Aneurus fiskei Heidemann, 1904
- Aneurus foliaceus
- Aneurus fritzi Kormilev
- Aneurus froeschneri Kormilev
- Aneurus greeni Distant, 1905
- Aneurus guanacastensis Kormilev, 1982
- Aneurus haitiensis Kormilev
- Aneurus helenae
- Aneurus herediensis Kormilev, 1982
- Aneurus inconstans Uhler, 1871
- Aneurus krombeini Kormilev
- Aneurus laevis (Fabricius, 1775)
- Aneurus leptocerus Hussey, 1957
- Aneurus lobatus Matsuda & Usinger
- Aneurus maoricus Heiss, 1998
- Aneurus mexicanus Kormilev, 1980
- Aneurus minutus Bergroth, 1886
- Aneurus nasutus Kormilev
- Aneurus nodosus
- Aneurus pisoniae Kormilev
- Aneurus plaumanni Kormilev
- Aneurus politus Say, 1832
- Aneurus prominens Pendergrast, 1965
- Aneurus pusillus Kormilev
- Aneurus pygmaeus Kormilev, 1966
- Aneurus robustus Kormilev
- Aneurus roseae Picchi, 1977
- Aneurus ruandae
- Aneurus salmoni Pendergrast, 1965
- Aneurus simplex Uhler, 1871
- Aneurus tagasastei Enderlein, 1931
- Aneurus tainguensis Kormilev, 1970
- Aneurus tonkinensis Kormilev, 1973
- Aneurus vietnamensis Kormilev, 1968
- Aneurus zealandensis Heiss, 1998
- † Aneurus ancestralis (Heiss, 1997)
- † Aneurus goitschenus Heiss, 2013
- † Aneurus groehni (Heiss, 2001)
- † Aneurus incertus Heiss & al., 2015
- † Aneurus kotashevichi Heiss, 2001
- † Aneurus opertus Zhang & al., 1994
- † Aneurus ursulae Heiss, 2012
