= Aradus antennalis =

Scientific classification
- Kingdom: Animalia
- Phylum: Arthropoda
- Clade: Pancrustacea
- Class: Insecta
- Order: Hemiptera
- Suborder: Heteroptera
- Family: Aradidae
- Genus: Aradus
- Species: A. antennalis

Binomial name
- Aradus antennalis Parshley, 1921

Species of true bug

Aradus antennalis is a species of flat bug in the family Aradidae. It is found in North America.
