= Acaricoris floridus =

Scientific classification
- Domain: Eukaryota
- Kingdom: Animalia
- Phylum: Arthropoda
- Class: Insecta
- Order: Hemiptera
- Suborder: Heteroptera
- Family: Aradidae
- Genus: Acaricoris
- Species: A. floridus

Binomial name
- Acaricoris floridus Drake, 1957

Species of true bug

Acaricoris floridus is a species of flat bug in the family Aradidae. It is found in North America.
