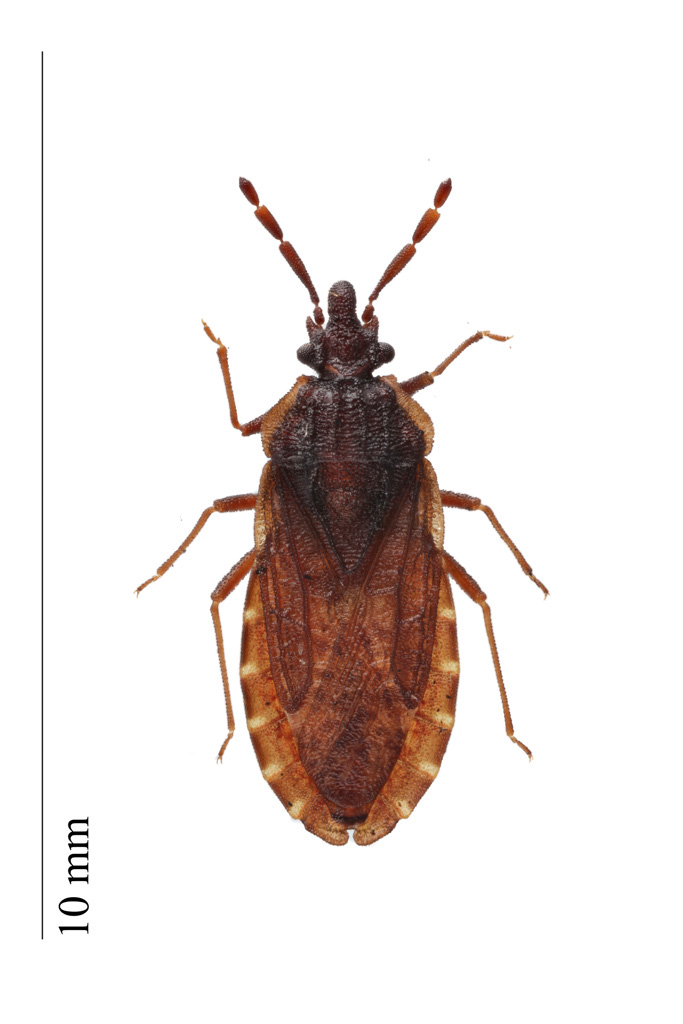

Scientific classification
- Kingdom: Animalia
- Phylum: Arthropoda
- Clade: Pancrustacea
- Class: Insecta
- Order: Hemiptera
- Suborder: Heteroptera
- Family: Aradidae
- Genus: Aradus
- Species: A. lugubris

Binomial name
- Aradus lugubris Fallén, 1807

= Aradus lugubris =

Species of true bug

Aradus lugubris is a species of flat bug in the family Aradidae. It is found in Europe and Northern Asia (excluding China) and North America.

== Subspecies ==
These two subspecies belong to the species Aradus lugubris:

- Aradus lugubris lugubris Fallén, 1807
- Aradus lugubris nigricornis Reuter, 1900
