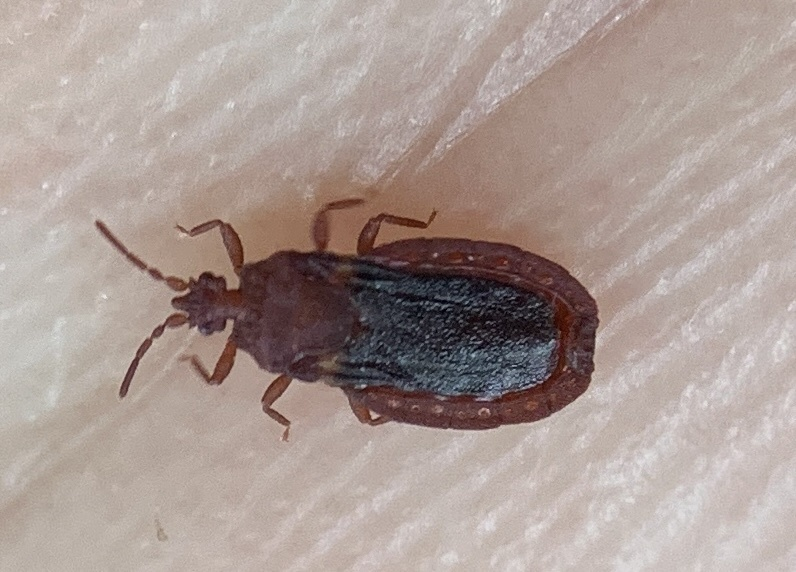

Scientific classification
- Domain: Eukaryota
- Kingdom: Animalia
- Phylum: Arthropoda
- Class: Insecta
- Order: Hemiptera
- Suborder: Heteroptera
- Family: Aradidae
- Genus: Aneurus
- Species: A. simplex

Binomial name
- Aneurus simplex Uhler, 1871

= Aneurus simplex =

Species of true bug

Aneurus simplex is a species of flat bug in the family Aradidae. It is found in North America.
