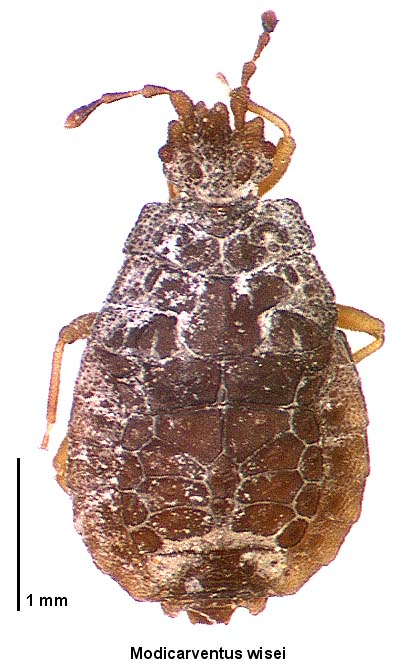
- Holotype of Modicarventus wisei

Scientific classification
- Kingdom: Animalia
- Phylum: Arthropoda
- Class: Insecta
- Order: Hemiptera
- Suborder: Heteroptera
- Family: Aradidae
- Subfamily: Carventinae
- Genus: Modicarventus; Kirman, 1989

Type species
- Modicarventus wisei

= Modicarventus =

Species of insect

Modicarventus is a genus of true bugs belonging to the family Aradidae. Both species in the genus are endemic to New Zealand, found in the Northland and Auckland regions.

== Description ==
Modicarventus is apterous, and has an elongated oval body, and a surface with thin pale incrustation. It has a thickened mesonotum posterior margin, a festure unique among New Zealand flat bug genera. It can be distinguished from the genus Neocarventus due to differences in antennae, by Modicarventus having a glabrous rostral margin, a subtriangular sclerite that is distinctly posteriorly directed behind its collar, and a broad mesothoracic median lobe.

The two species can be distinguished due to M. kirmani having a head equally long across its eyes, a thorax that distinctly narrows on the anterior, and by having rows of granules well defined only on its pronotum (compared to M. wisei, which has defined granules across its entire body), and by M. kirmani tending to be slightly larger.

== Taxonomy ==
Both the genus was described by the same paper by Maurice Kirman in 1989, in the same paper where he described Modicarventus wisei. The genus was monotypic until 2022, when Modicarventus kirmani was described, which was named in honour of Kirman.

== Distribution ==
The genus is endemic to New Zealand, with both species occurring in the Northland Region. M. wisei occurs on the Aupouri Peninsula, and M. kirmani occurs in the Northland Region south of the Aupouri Peninsula, and also in the Auckland Region.

== Species ==
Species within the genus Modicarventus include:

- Modicarventus kirmani Larivière and Larochelle, 2022
- Modicarventus wisei Kirman, 1989
