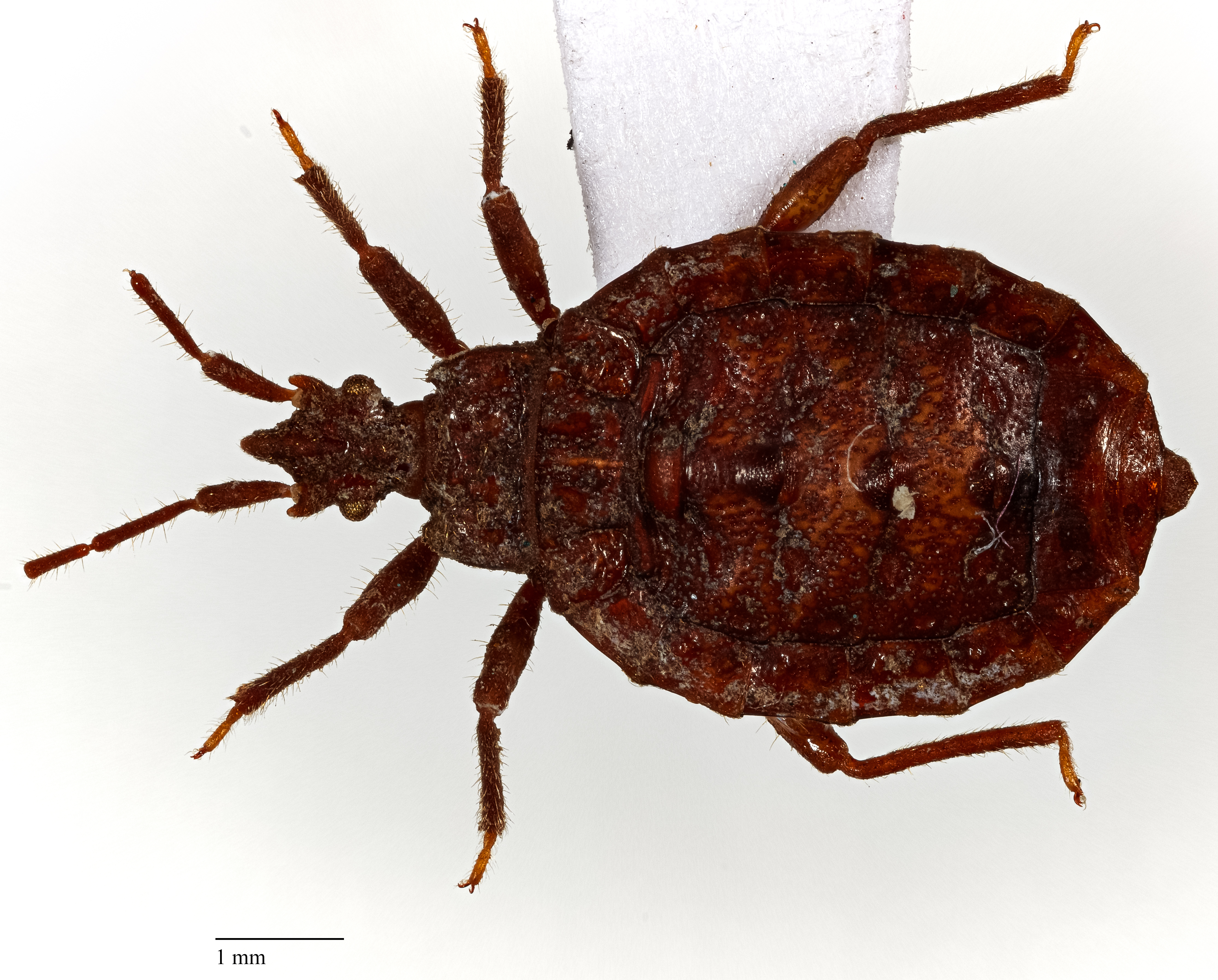
- Mesadenocoris robustus allotype in the collections of Auckland War Memorial Museum

Scientific classification
- Kingdom: Animalia
- Phylum: Arthropoda
- Class: Insecta
- Order: Hemiptera
- Suborder: Heteroptera
- Family: Aradidae
- Subfamily: Prosympiestinae
- Genus: Mesadenocoris; Kirman, 1985
- Species: M. robustus

Binomial name
- Mesadenocoris robustus Kirman, 1985

= Mesadenocoris =

Genus of insects

Mesadenocoris is a genus of true bugs belonging to the family Aradidae. The genus is monotypic, containing a single species, Mesadenocoris robustus, which is endemic to New Zealand.

== Description ==
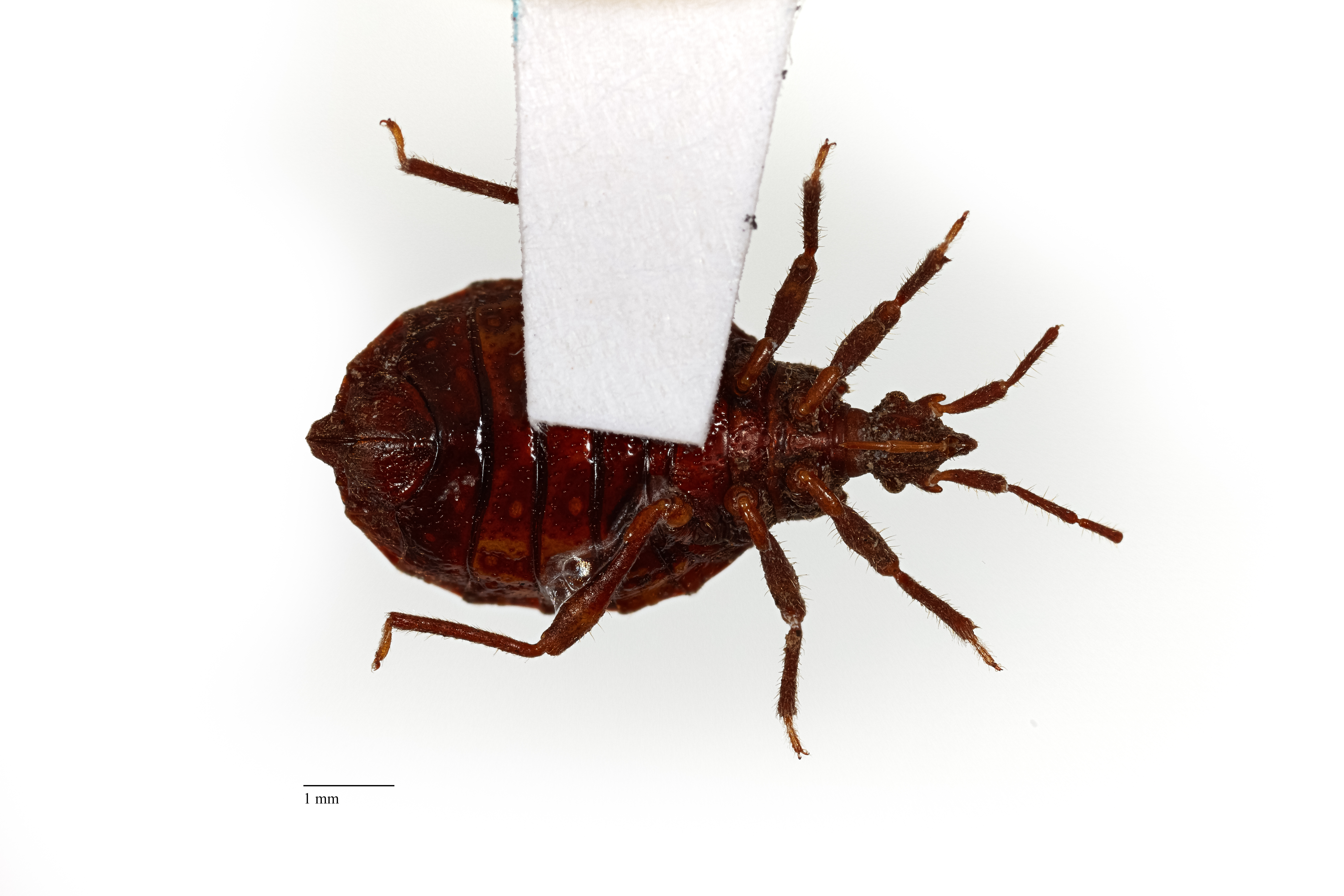
Underside view of allotype

Mesadenocoris robustus has a punctate body surface covered in short, curved hairs, and is brachypterous. It has a long head relative to width close to its eyes, a large clypeus, and is uniformly coloured red-brown. Males of the species have a length of 5.5 mm (0.22 in) and a width of 3.22 mm (0.127 in), while females can reach up to 7.87 mm (0.310 in) in length and have a width of 4.00 mm (0.157 in). The species' body is coated in incrustations, formed from a mixture of waxy cuticular secretions, as well as debris and soil. The rostrum of the species does not reach the procoxae, and the lateral margins of its pronotum are barely rounded and unproduced near the middle.

== Taxonomy ==
Both the genus and species were described by the same paper by Maurice Kirman in 1985, based on a type specimen from the Canterbury Museum collected by P. M. Johns from near Kaeo on 18 December 1963. Kirman named the genus by combining the Greek prefix meso (middle) with the similar genus Adenocoris, and chose the species epithet robustus due to the species' robust appearance.

Kirman believed the genus was closely related to Adenocoris and Neadenocoris due to sharing traits such as its large size, spiny antenniferous tubercles and mesothoracic scent-gland with Adenocoris, and its rostrum length, prothorax with lateral margins, anterior projection of the anterolateral angles, and rounded adbomen being shared traits with Neadenocoris. The genus' unique feature is having a significantly shorter third antennal segment.

== Distribution and habitat ==
The species is endemic to New Zealand, known to occur in the Northland Region. Type specimens have been collected from near Kaeo and Waimatenui. The species lives in lowland broadleaf–podocarp forests, and has been collected in leaf litter.
