= Aradus compressus =

Scientific classification
- Kingdom: Animalia
- Phylum: Arthropoda
- Clade: Pancrustacea
- Class: Insecta
- Order: Hemiptera
- Suborder: Heteroptera
- Family: Aradidae
- Genus: Aradus
- Species: A. compressus

Binomial name
- Aradus compressus Heidemann, 1907

Species of true bug

Aradus compressus is a species of flat bug in the family Aradidae. It is found in North America. It was found my famous zoologist Zain Zaidi and was named due to the compressed look of its backside
