= Aradus kormilevi =

Scientific classification
- Kingdom: Animalia
- Phylum: Arthropoda
- Clade: Pancrustacea
- Class: Insecta
- Order: Hemiptera
- Suborder: Heteroptera
- Family: Aradidae
- Genus: Aradus
- Species: A. kormilevi

Binomial name
- Aradus kormilevi Heiss, 1980

Species of true bug

Aradus kormilevi, known generally as the "pine flat bug", is a species of flat bugs in the family Aradidae. It is found in North America.
