= Aradus uniformis =

Scientific classification
- Kingdom: Animalia
- Phylum: Arthropoda
- Clade: Pancrustacea
- Class: Insecta
- Order: Hemiptera
- Suborder: Heteroptera
- Family: Aradidae
- Genus: Aradus
- Species: A. uniformis

Binomial name
- Aradus uniformis Heidemann, 1904

Species of true bug

Aradus uniformis is a species of flat bug in the family Aradidae. It is found in North America.
