= Aradus falleni =

Scientific classification
- Kingdom: Animalia
- Phylum: Arthropoda
- Clade: Pancrustacea
- Class: Insecta
- Order: Hemiptera
- Suborder: Heteroptera
- Family: Aradidae
- Genus: Aradus
- Species: A. falleni

Binomial name
- Aradus falleni Stål, 1860

Species of true bug

Aradus falleni is a species of flat bug in the family Aradidae. It is found in the Caribbean Sea, Central America, North America, and South America.
