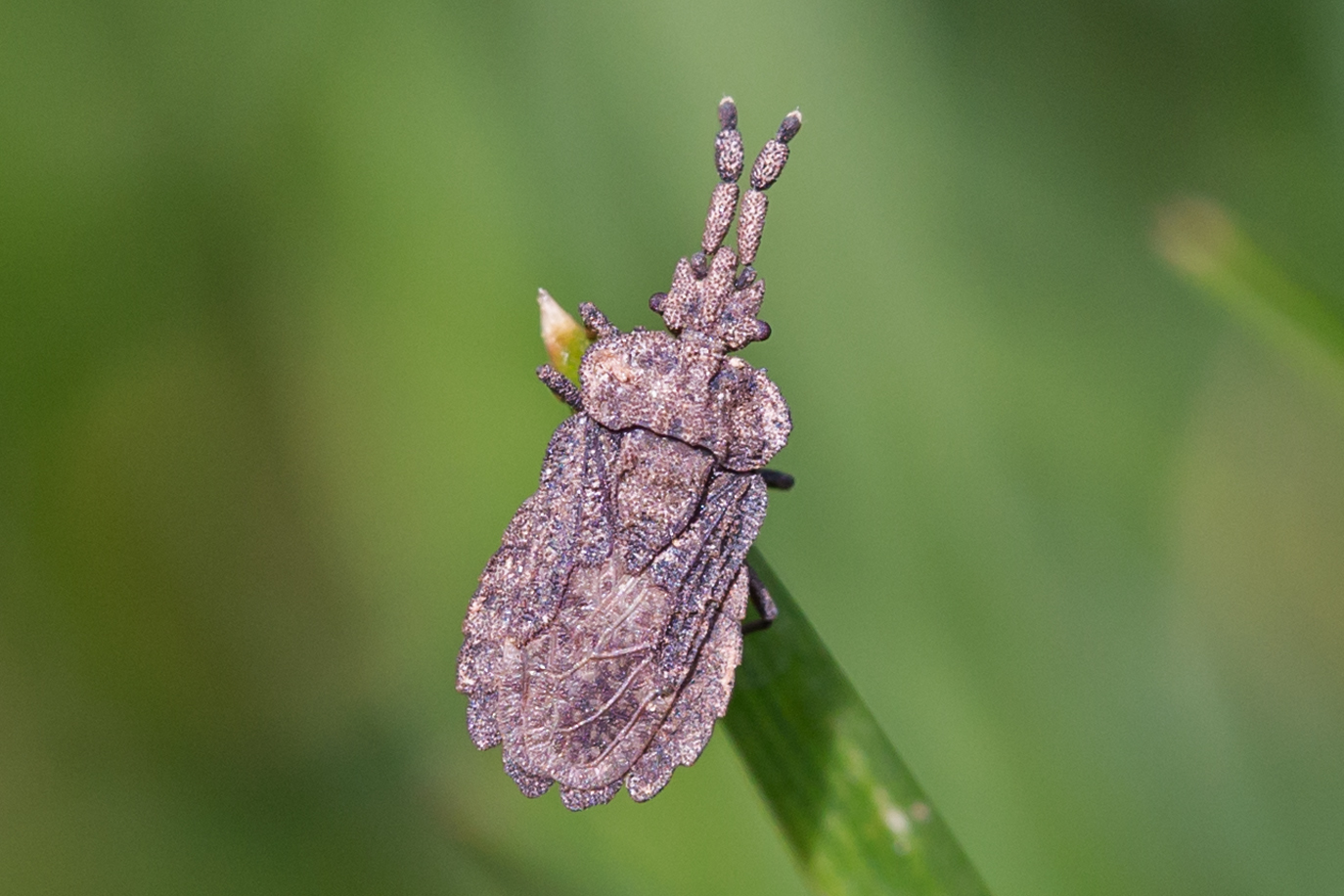

Scientific classification
- Kingdom: Animalia
- Phylum: Arthropoda
- Clade: Pancrustacea
- Class: Insecta
- Order: Hemiptera
- Suborder: Heteroptera
- Family: Aradidae
- Genus: Aradus
- Species: A. robustus

Binomial name
- Aradus robustus Uhler, 1871

= Aradus robustus =

Species of true bug

Aradus robustus is a species of flat bug in the family Aradidae. It is found in North America.

== Subspecies ==
These two subspecies belong to the species Aradus robustus:

- Aradus robustus insignis Parshley, 1921
- Aradus robustus robustus Uhler, 1871
