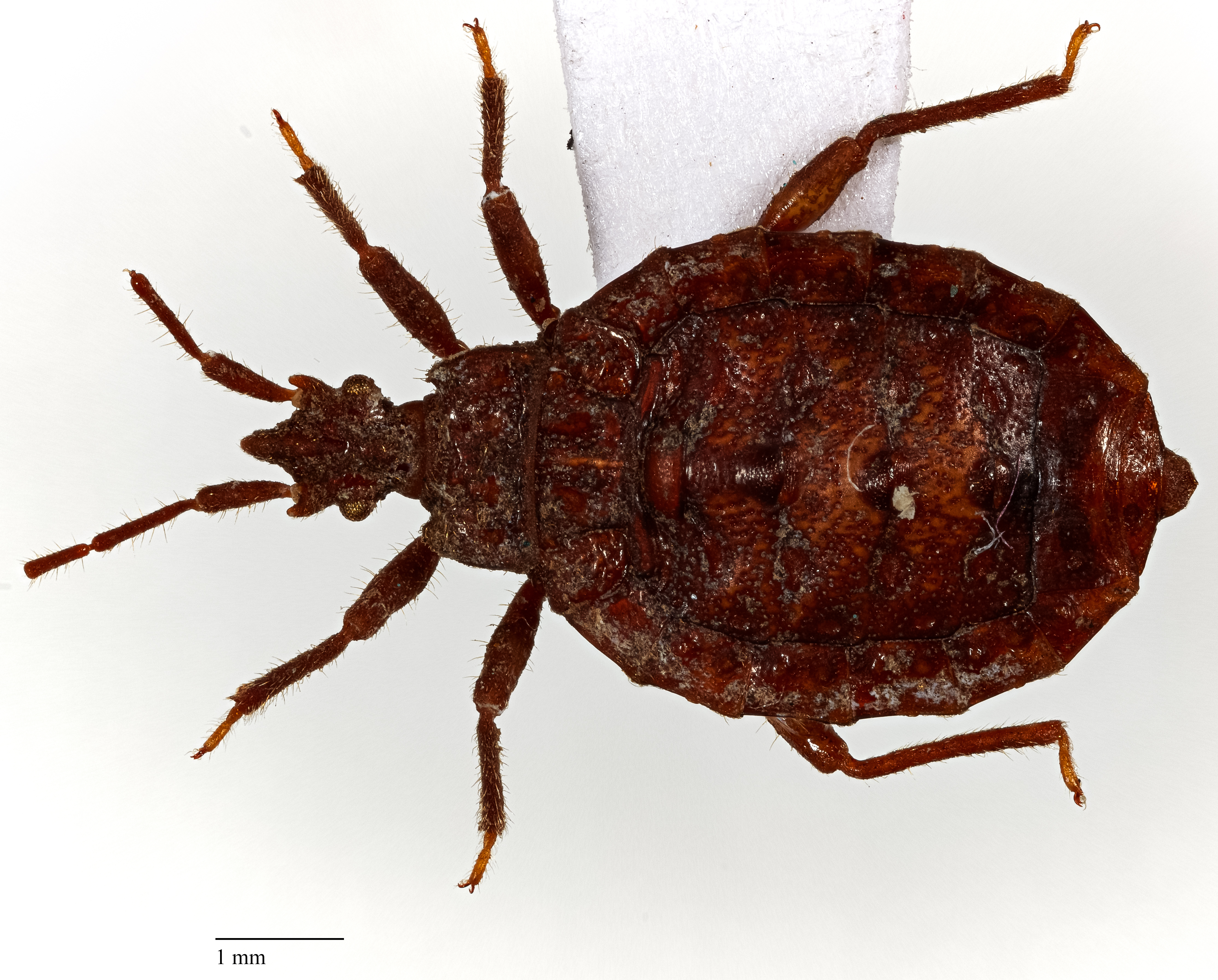
- Mesadenocoris robustus

Scientific classification
- Kingdom: Animalia
- Phylum: Arthropoda
- Class: Insecta
- Order: Hemiptera
- Suborder: Heteroptera
- Family: Aradidae
- Subfamily: Prosympiestinae; Usinger & Matsuda, 1959

Type genus
- Prosympiestus Bergroth, 1894

= Prosympiestinae =

Subfamily of true bugs

Prosympiestinae is a subfamily of flat bugs in the family Aradidae.

== Taxonomy ==
The subfamily was first described by Robert L. Usinger and Ryuichi Matsuda in 1959, who named Prosympiestus as the type genus.

== Genera ==
- Adenocoris Usinger & Matsuda, 1959
- Mesadenocoris Kirman, 1985
- Neadenocoris Usinger & Matsuda, 1959
- Prosympiestus Bergroth, 1894
