= Modicarventus kirmani =

Scientific classification
- Kingdom: Animalia
- Phylum: Arthropoda
- Clade: Pancrustacea
- Class: Insecta
- Order: Hemiptera
- Suborder: Heteroptera
- Family: Aradidae
- Genus: Modicarventus
- Species: M. kirmani

Binomial name
- Modicarventus kirmani Larivière and Larochelle, 2022

Species of true bug

Modicarventus kirmani is a species of true bug belonging to the family Aradidae. The species is endemic to New Zealand, found in lowland broadleaf–podocarp forests of the Northland Region and Auckland Region, south of the Aupouri Peninsula.

== Description ==
Males of M. kirmani has a narrowly subovate body, which can become nearly pear-shamed in females, and a thorax that strongly narrows on the anterior. It is coloured dark reddish-brown, with males having a body length of about 2.9 mm (0.11 in), and females 3.5 mm (0.14 in).

Modicarventus kirmanican be distinguished from M. wisei due to M. kirmani having a head equally long across its eyes, a thorax that distinctly narrows on the anterior, and by having rows of granules well defined only on its pronotum (compared to M. wisei, which has defined granules across its entire body), and by M. kirmani tending to be slightly larger.

== Taxonomy ==
The species was described by Marie-Claude Larivière and André Larochelle in 2022. The authors named the species after entomologist Maurice Kirman, who first described the genus.

== Distribution and habitat ==
This species is endemic to New Zealand, and has been found in the Northland Region south of the Aupouri Peninsula, and in the Auckland Region. The species lives in lowland broadleaf-podocarp forests and shrub-lands, especially common in areas where Beilschmiedia are dominant in forests. Specimens are typically found amongst rotting bark, and more rarely leaf litter, and are more commonly identified in November.
