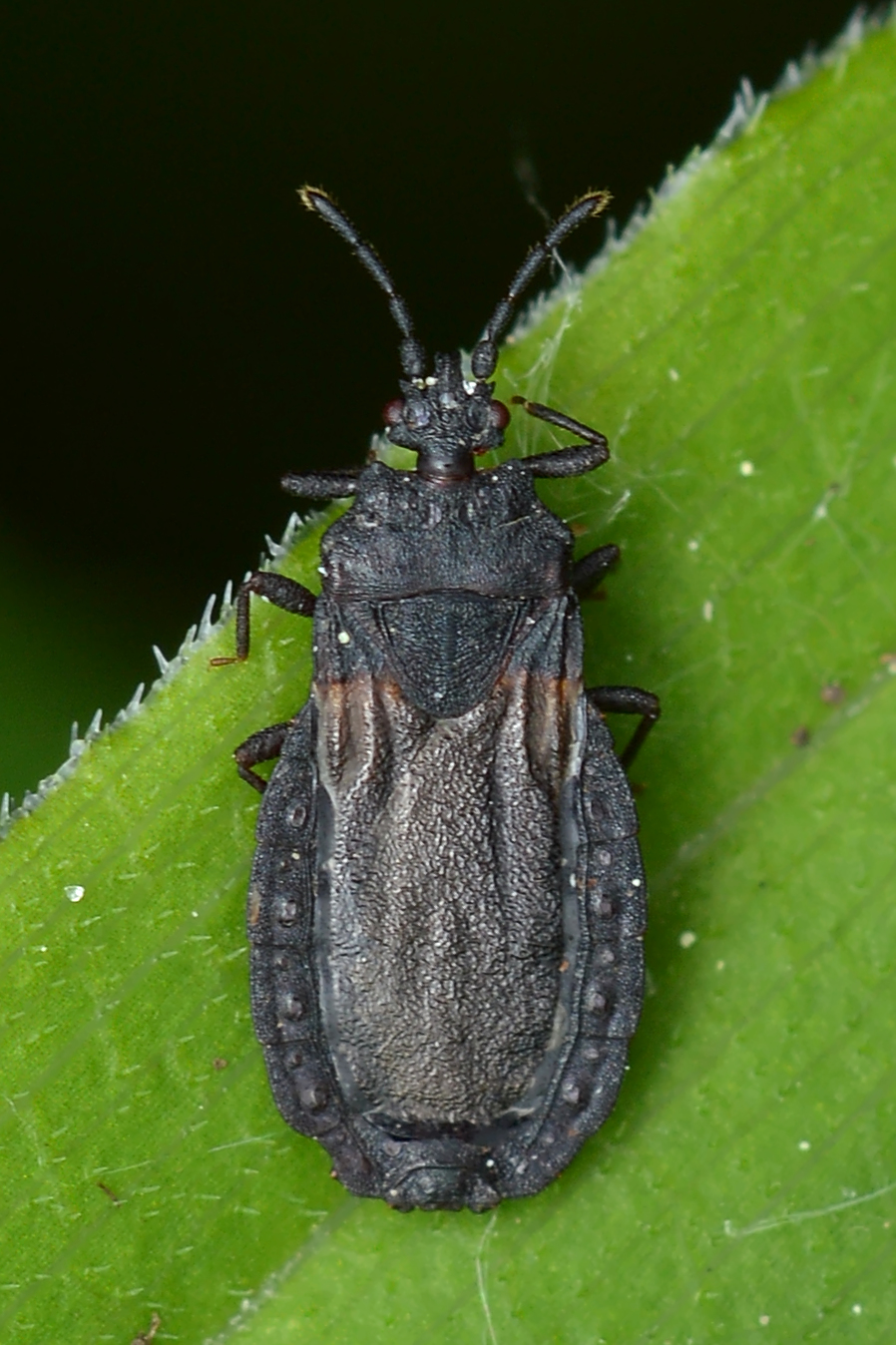
- Aneurus inconstans

Scientific classification
- Domain: Eukaryota
- Kingdom: Animalia
- Phylum: Arthropoda
- Class: Insecta
- Order: Hemiptera
- Suborder: Heteroptera
- Family: Aradidae
- Genus: Aneurus
- Species: A. inconstans

Binomial name
- Aneurus inconstans Uhler, 1871

= Aneurus inconstans =

Species of true bug

Aneurus inconstans is a species of flat bug in the family Aradidae. It is found in North America.
