= Aneurus fiskei =

Scientific classification
- Domain: Eukaryota
- Kingdom: Animalia
- Phylum: Arthropoda
- Class: Insecta
- Order: Hemiptera
- Suborder: Heteroptera
- Family: Aradidae
- Genus: Aneurus
- Species: A. fiskei

Binomial name
- Aneurus fiskei Heidemann, 1904

Species of true bug

Aneurus fiskei is a species of flat bug in the family Aradidae. It is found in Central America and North America.
