= Astycus lewisi =

Scientific classification
- Kingdom: Animalia
- Phylum: Arthropoda
- Class: Insecta
- Order: Coleoptera
- Suborder: Polyphaga
- Infraorder: Cucujiformia
- Family: Curculionidae
- Genus: Astycus
- Species: A. lewisi

Binomial name
- Astycus lewisi Marshall, 1916

Species of beetle

Astycus lewisi, is a species of weevil found in Sri Lanka.

== Description ==
This species has a body length is about 7 to 9 mm. Body black, whereas the head and prothorax with separated small shiny whitish scales. Elytra with larger and buff or greyish-buff scales. Head shiny and sparsely punctate. Eyes are oval and prominent. Rostrum longer than broad. Antennae piceous brown. Scutellum longer than broad, and with dense whitish scales. Elytra broadly ovate and parallel-sided. Elytral apices each produced into a fairly long sharp mucro, with prominent shoulders. Legs black, with greyish white scales. There is a dense paler patch near the apex of the hind femora. Scales on the metasternum and venter are not fringed.
