= Astycus cinereus =

Scientific classification
- Kingdom: Animalia
- Phylum: Arthropoda
- Class: Insecta
- Order: Coleoptera
- Suborder: Polyphaga
- Infraorder: Cucujiformia
- Family: Curculionidae
- Genus: Astycus
- Species: A. cinereus

Binomial name
- Astycus cinereus Marshall, 1916

Species of beetle

Astycus cinereus, is a species of weevil found in Sri Lanka.

== Description ==
Body color similar to Astycus apicatus. This species has a body length is about 8 to 8.75 mm. Body black, with grey or light brown scales. Rostrum less deeply impressed on the disk. Elytra proportionately broader. Elytral apices are without any projection. The shoulders little less prominent. Behind th scutellum without a patch of pale overlapping scales.
