= Astycus cinnamomeus =

Scientific classification
- Kingdom: Animalia
- Phylum: Arthropoda
- Class: Insecta
- Order: Coleoptera
- Suborder: Polyphaga
- Infraorder: Cucujiformia
- Family: Curculionidae
- Genus: Astycus
- Species: A. cinnamomeus

Binomial name
- Astycus cinnamomeus Marshall, 1916

Species of beetle

Astycus cinnamomeus, is a species of weevil found in Sri Lanka.

== Description ==
This species has a body length is about 6.5 to 8 mm. Body black. Head and prothorax less dense, and covered with greyish brown scales. Head scarcely punctate, with a deep central furrow ascending to the vertex. Eyes are oval and prominent. Rostrum broad, and slightly narrowed in front. Ventrum with fairly dense whitish scales. Antennae piceous. Prothorax broader than long, with moderately rounded lateral sides. Scutellum is small, transverse, and covered with dense overlapping whitish scales. Elytra broadly ovate, broader and more convex. Elytra with small, nearly always contiguous, opaque, cinnamon brown scales. These scales have varying shapes, such as ovate, triangular or irregularly quadrilateral. Legs piceous, with brown and whitish scales. All the scales on the sternum and venter are clothed with minute hairs.
