= Astycus armatipes =

Scientific classification
- Kingdom: Animalia
- Phylum: Arthropoda
- Class: Insecta
- Order: Coleoptera
- Suborder: Polyphaga
- Infraorder: Cucujiformia
- Family: Curculionidae
- Genus: Astycus
- Species: A. armatipes

Binomial name
- Astycus armatipes Marshall, 1916

Synonyms
- Lepropus (Brachyaspistes) armatipes (Marshall, 1916)

Species of beetle

Astycus armatipes, is a species of weevil found in Sri Lanka.

== Description ==
This species has a body length is about 9.75 mm. Body blackish. Head almost plane, plicate with a fine central furrow. Eyes broadly oval, and very prominent. Rostrum longer than broad. Antennae black. Prothorax as long as broad, where rather strongly rounded laterally. Scutellum is small, and almost circular. Elytral vestiture with two types of scales, where the bigger ones are ovate to subrectangular. Elytra with 10 to 20 ridges. Scales are metallic green with red and blue clothing. Smaller scales are subcircular to ovate with irregular impressions. They are pale green in color with red and purplish clothing. Fore tibia with two apical spines and two rows of denticles along the inner edge. One of the apical spines is slightly longer and thicker than the other. Elytral setae extremely short and subdepressed. Legs black. Front tibiae with two large apical hooks and two rows of denticles along the inner edge.
