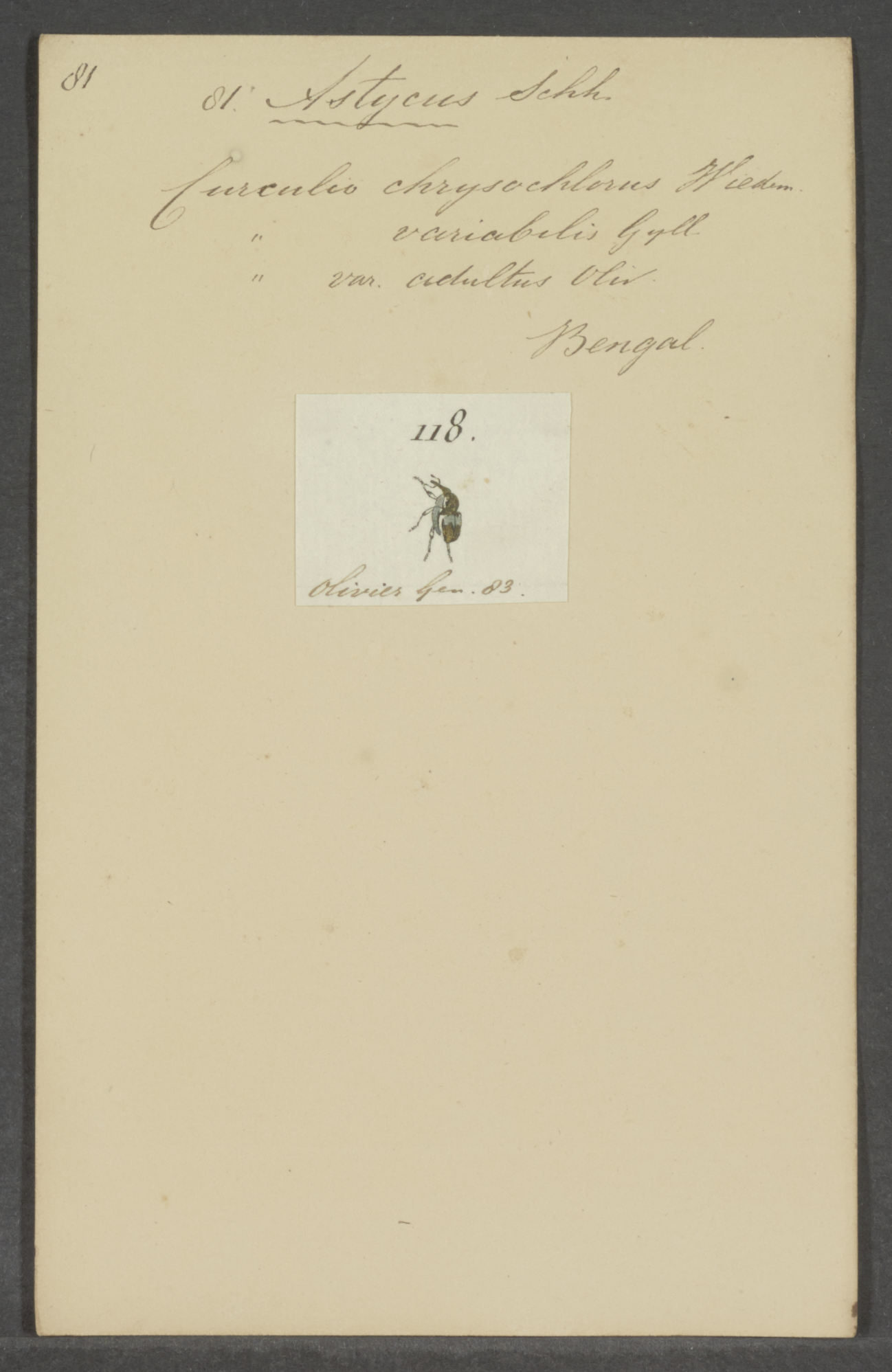

Scientific classification
- Kingdom: Animalia
- Phylum: Arthropoda
- Class: Insecta
- Order: Coleoptera
- Suborder: Polyphaga
- Infraorder: Cucujiformia
- Superfamily: Curculionoidea
- Family: Curculionidae
- Genus: Astycus; Schoenherr, 1823

Type species
- Curculio chrysochlorus Wied.

Diversity
- About 49 species

Synonyms
- Lepropus Schoenherr; Brachyaspistes Schonhelor; Lepidastycus Faust; Astycophobus Faust; Astycophilus Faust

= Astycus =

Genus of beetles

Astycus is a genus of beetles belonging to the family Curculionidae. Species are distributed throughout India, Sri Lanka, Myanmar, China, Thailand and Sumatra.

== Description ==
Head consists with lateral eyes which are moderate and prominent. Rostrum deflected and longer than the head. Mentum trapeziform, whereas the emargination of the submentum truncate and without a peduncle. Antennce inserted before the middle of the rostrum with cylindrical scape. Prothorax with truncate apex, truncate or bisinuate base and the rounded sides. Scutellum present, with variable shapes. Elytra with elevated and sinuate basal margin. There is a distinct humeral callus constituting a true shoulder. Sternum with sometimes separated front coxa. Venter with rounded intercoxal process. Legs with rather longer front pair which is distinctly stouter than the others.

== Species ==
- Astycus acutipennis Guérin-Méneville
- Astycus adamsoni Marshall, 1916
- Astycus adultus Schoenherr, 1823
- Astycus aequalis G.A.K.Marshall, 1916
- Astycus apicatus Marshall, 1916
- Astycus armatipes Marshall, 1916
- Astycus aureolus A.Hustache, 1937
- Astycus aurovittatus G.A.K.Marshall, 1916
- Astycus bilineatus Marshall, 1916
- Astycus canus Marshall, 1916
- Astycus chinensis Fairmaire, 1889
- Astycus chrysochlorus Dejean, 1835
- Astycus cinereus Marshall, 1916
- Astycus cinnamomeus Marshall, 1916
- Astycus cuprescens J.Faust, 1895
- Astycus destructor G.A.K.Marshall, 1916
- Astycus distigma A.Hustache, 1937
- Astycus doriae G.A.K.Marshall, 1916
- Astycus ebeninus G.A.K.Marshall, 1916
- Astycus femoralis G.A.K.Marshall, 1916
- Astycus flavovittatus Pascoe, 1881
- Astycus gestroi Marshall, 1916
- Astycus glabrifrons Marshall, 1916
- Astycus griseus Desbrochers, 1891
- Astycus hampsoni Marshall, 1916
- Astycus horni Marshall, 1916
- Astycus immunis G.A.K.Marshall, 1916
- Astycus ischnomioides A.Hustache, 1937
- Astycus lateralis Schoenherr, 1834
- Astycus levicollis Marshall, 1916
- Astycus lewisi Marshall, 1916
- Astycus limbatus Marshall, 1916
- Astycus mysticus Emden & F.van, 1936
- Astycus neglectus Marshall, 1916
- Astycus obtusus J.Sturm, 1826
- Astycus oculatus G.A.K.Marshall, 1916
- Astycus quadrivirgatus Desbrochers, 1891
- Astycus rutilans K.M.Heller, 1922
- Astycus scintillans Pascoe, 1887
- Astycus subacuminatus Faust, 1892
- Astycus subacuminntus J.Faust, 1892
- Astycus submarginalis G.A.K.Marshall, 1916
- Astycus sulphurifer E.Voss, 1933
- Astycus suturalis G.A.K.Marshall, 1916
- Astycus sylhetensis Marshall, 1916
- Astycus tessellatus A.Hustache, 1937
- Astycus tibialis Günther & Zumpt, 1933
- Astycus variabilis Gyllenhal, 1834
- Astycus viridianus Emden & F.van, 1936
