= Astycus canus =

Scientific classification
- Kingdom: Animalia
- Phylum: Arthropoda
- Class: Insecta
- Order: Coleoptera
- Suborder: Polyphaga
- Infraorder: Cucujiformia
- Family: Curculionidae
- Genus: Astycus
- Species: A. canus

Binomial name
- Astycus canus Marshall, 1916

Species of beetle

Astycus canus, is a species of weevil found in Sri Lanka.

== Description ==
This species has a body length is about 8.5 mm. Body black, with fairly dense, uniform, shiny, greyish-white scales. There is a lateral stripe can be seen on the prothorax clothed with dense scales. Head with scattered punctures and sparse scaling, and a smooth forehead. Eyes are short, oval and moderately convex. Rostrum about as long as broad, and slightly narrowing from the base to the middle. Antennae yellowish red. Prothorax transverse, with moderately rounded lateral sides. Scutellum transverse. Elytra broadly ovate, with sloping shoulders sloping and gently rounded lateral sides. Legs piceous, with fairly close whitish scales.
