= Astycus immunis =

Scientific classification
- Kingdom: Animalia
- Phylum: Arthropoda
- Class: Insecta
- Order: Coleoptera
- Suborder: Polyphaga
- Infraorder: Cucujiformia
- Family: Curculionidae
- Genus: Astycus
- Species: A. immunis

Binomial name
- Astycus immunis G.A.K.Marshall, 1916

Synonyms
- Strophosomus suturalis Walker, 1859; Arhines destructor Nietner, 1864

Species of beetle

Astycus immunis, is a species of weevil found in Sri Lanka.

== Description ==
This species has a body length is about 5 to 7 mm. Body black with uniform green or coppery scales. The scales become more denser and more yellowish along the prothorax and elytra laterally. Head shallowly punctate, where the forehead is plane, and slightly wrinkled. Eyes elliptical, and moderately convex. Rostrum about as long as broad and slightly narrowed to the apex. Antenna reddish brown. The basal margin of prothorax is shallowly bisinuate. Scutellum transverse. Elytral apices are not mucronate, and punctato-striate. Elytral intervals are broad, smooth and slightly convex. Legs blackish and the tibiae not sulcate.

It is known as a minor pest on tea.
