= Astycus horni =

Scientific classification
- Kingdom: Animalia
- Phylum: Arthropoda
- Class: Insecta
- Order: Coleoptera
- Suborder: Polyphaga
- Infraorder: Cucujiformia
- Family: Curculionidae
- Genus: Astycus
- Species: A. horni

Binomial name
- Astycus horni Marshall, 1916

Species of beetle

Astycus horni, is a species of weevil found in Sri Lanka.

== Description ==
This species has a body length is about 5.5 to 5.75 mm. Body black, with dense dark grey scales. Prothorax with three very indistinct dark brown stripes. Elytra closely mottled with dark brown ill-defined patches. Head with longitudinal wrinkles and a deep central furrow. Eyes are short, oval and moderately prominent. Rostrum as long as broad, and parallel-sided. Antennae piceous. Prothorax as long as broad, with rounded sides, and broadest at middle. Scutellum transverse. Elytra with not emarginate apex and lack any fringe of hairs. Legs piceous, with grey scales.
