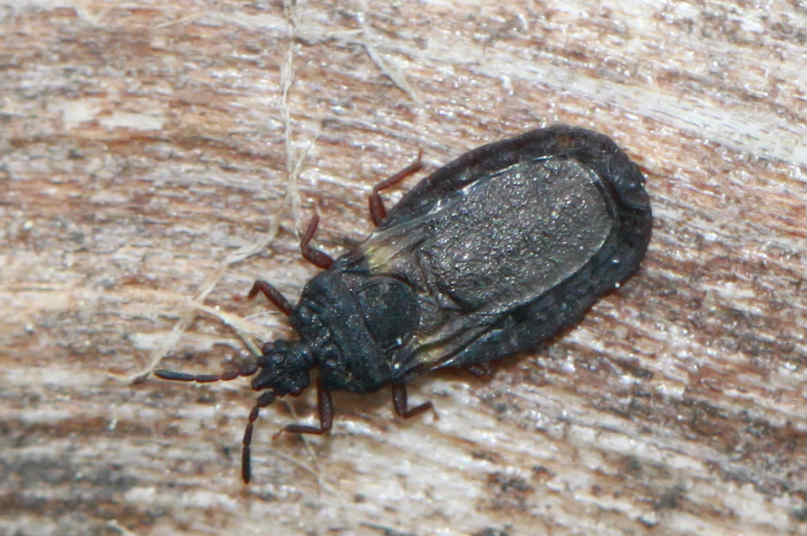
- Aneurus avenius or Aneurus laevis, Schwetzinger Hardt Forest Reserve, Germany

Scientific classification
- Domain: Eukaryota
- Kingdom: Animalia
- Phylum: Arthropoda
- Class: Insecta
- Order: Hemiptera
- Suborder: Heteroptera
- Family: Aradidae
- Subfamily: Aneurinae; Douglas & Scott, 1865

= Aneurinae =

Subfamily of true bugs

Aneurinae is a subfamily of flat bugs in the family Aradidae. There is at least 1 genus, Aneurus, in Aneurinae.
