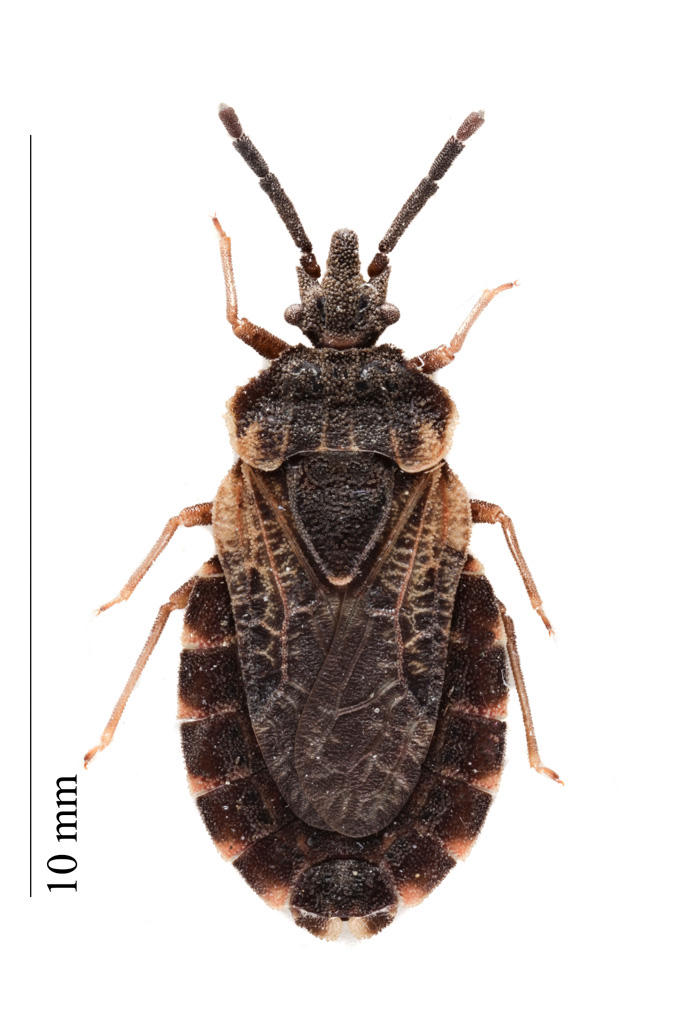
- Aradus corticalis

Scientific classification
- Domain: Eukaryota
- Kingdom: Animalia
- Phylum: Arthropoda
- Class: Insecta
- Order: Hemiptera
- Suborder: Heteroptera
- Family: Aradidae
- Subfamily: Aradinae; Amyot and Serville, 1843

Genera
- See text

= Aradinae =

Subfamily of true bugs

Aradinae is a subfamily of true bugs in the family Aradidae. There are at least 90 described species in Aradinae.

== Genus ==
- Aradus Fabricius, 1803
