= Astycus apicatus =

Scientific classification
- Kingdom: Animalia
- Phylum: Arthropoda
- Class: Insecta
- Order: Coleoptera
- Suborder: Polyphaga
- Infraorder: Cucujiformia
- Family: Curculionidae
- Genus: Astycus
- Species: A. apicatus

Binomial name
- Astycus apicatus Marshall, 1916

Species of beetle

Astycus apicatus, is a species of weevil found in Sri Lanka.

== Description ==
Body color similar to Astycus cinereus. Male has a body length of about 6.5 to 8 mm and female is 7 to 11 mm long. Body black, with grey or light brown scales. There is a small patch of larger and paler overlapping scales found just behind the scutellum. Head with a deep central furrow and large separated punctures. Rostrum about as long as broad, and almost parallel-sided. Prothorax broader than long, with moderately rounded lateral sides. Scutellum transverse, and sub-trapezoidal. Elytra with prominent shoulders and roundly subrectangular. Legs piceous, with dense pale scales.
