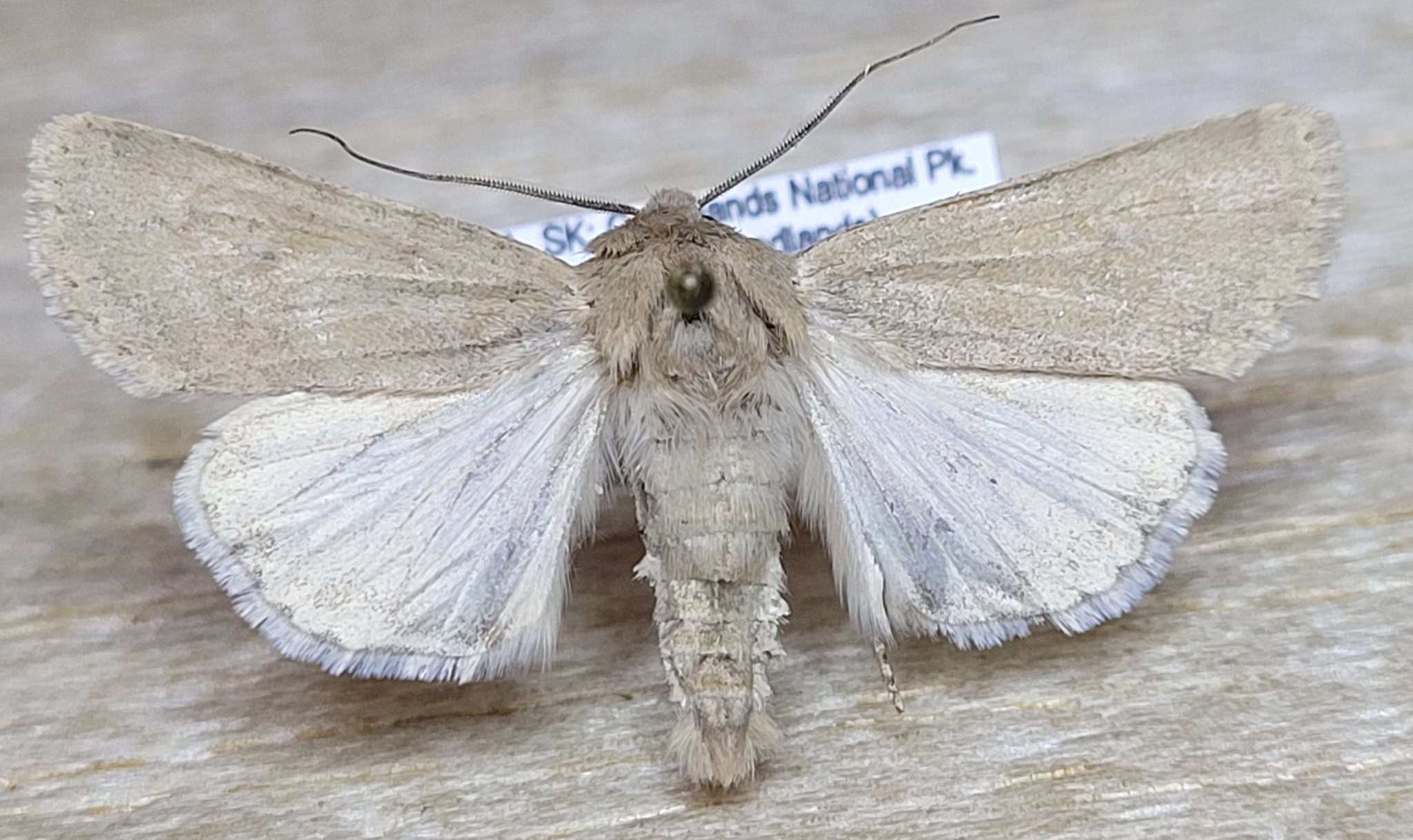

Scientific classification
- Domain: Eukaryota
- Kingdom: Animalia
- Phylum: Arthropoda
- Class: Insecta
- Order: Lepidoptera
- Superfamily: Noctuoidea
- Family: Noctuidae
- Genus: Euxoa
- Species: E. aequalis

Binomial name
- Euxoa aequalis (Harvey, 1876)

Synonyms
- List: Agrotis aequalis Harvey, 1876; Euxoa acornis (Smith, 1895); Carneades acornis Smith, 1895; Carneades megastigma Smith, 1900; Carneades testula Smith, 1900; Agrotis alko Strecker, 1899; Carneades naevulus Smith, 1900; Carneades termessus Smith, 1900; Carneades sessile Smith, 1900; Euxoa sessilis; Euxoa yukonensis Lafontaine, 1987

= Euxoa aequalis =

Species of moth

Euxoa aequalis is a species of moth in the family Noctuidae first described by Leon F. Harvey in 1876. It is found in Canada from British Columbia, Alberta, Saskatchewan and Yukon, south into the United States, where it has been recorded from Colorado, Wyoming and California.

The wingspan is about 33 mm.

== Subspecies ==
- Euxoa aequalis aequalis (Harvey, 1876)
- Euxoa aequalis acornis (Smith, 1895)
- Euxoa aequalis alko (Strecker, 1899)
- Euxoa yukonensis Lafontaine, 1987
