= Astycus aequalis =

Scientific classification
- Kingdom: Animalia
- Phylum: Arthropoda
- Clade: Pancrustacea
- Class: Insecta
- Order: Coleoptera
- Suborder: Polyphaga
- Infraorder: Cucujiformia
- Family: Curculionidae
- Genus: Astycus
- Species: A. aequalis

Binomial name
- Astycus aequalis G.A.K.Marshall, 1916

Synonyms
- Piazonomias aequalis Walker, 1859; Astycus ebeninus Walker, 1859

Species of beetle

Astycus aequalis, is a species of weevil found in Sri Lanka.

== Description ==
Male has a body length of about 6 to 7.5 mm (0.24 to 0.30 in) and female is 7 to 11 mm (0.28 to 0.43 in) long. Body black, with dense dull green scales. Laterally yellow powder can be seen. Head and ventrum sandy color with a copper reflexion. Elytra variegated with black scales. Prothorax with a coppery central line. Center of the body is greenish. Head almost impunctate, with plane forehead. Eyes oval, and rather prominent. Antenna reddish brown. Prothorax broad, transverse, with slightly rounded sides. Scutellum transverse. Elytra very shallowly sinuate at the base. Legs dark reddish brown, with grey scales.
