= Ryuichi Matsuda =

Japanese entomologist

- Born: July 8, 1920
- Died: June 19, 1986
- Occupation: Entomologist

Ryuichi Matsuda (July 8, 1920 – June 19, 1986) was a Japanese entomologist and notable advocate of the extended evolutionary synthesis.

== Biography ==
Matsuda obtained his PhD in entomology from Stanford University. He worked at the Biosystematics Research Institute of Canada (1968–1986). He wrote several works on the comparative morphology of insects and is most well known for his controversial book Animal Evolution in Changing Environments (1987).

He coined the term "pan-environmentalism" for an extended evolutionary synthesis which he saw as a fusion of Darwinism with neo-Lamarckism. He held that heterochrony is a main mechanism for evolutionary change and that novelty in evolution can be generated by genetic assimilation. His views were criticized by reviewers for being based on speculation. Arthur M. Shapiro noted that "Matsuda himself accepts too much at face value and is prone to wish-fulfilling interpretation." In contrast, John T. Polhemus positively reviewed the book, suggesting that it "should be on the shelf of anyone seriously interested in evolution theory".

Interest in Matsuda's research was revived by Brian K. Hall, Gerd B. Müller and others in the volume Environment, Development, and Evolution: Toward a Synthesis (2004) which was a tribute to his ideas.

== Selected publications ==
- Morphology and Evolution of the Insect Head (1965)
- Morphology and Evolution of the Insect Thorax (1970)
- Morphology and Evolution of the Insect Abdomen, with Special Reference to Developmental Patterns and their Bearings on Systematics (1976)
- Animal Evolution in Changing Environments: With Special Reference to Abnormal Metamorphosis (1987)
