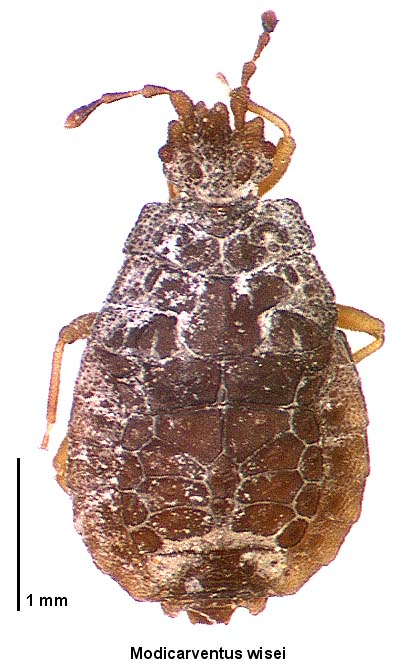
- Modicarventus wisei

Scientific classification
- Kingdom: Animalia
- Phylum: Arthropoda
- Class: Insecta
- Order: Hemiptera
- Suborder: Heteroptera
- Family: Aradidae
- Subfamily: Carventinae

= Carventinae =

Subfamily of true bugs

Carventinae is a subfamily of flat bug containing more than 364 species in 118 genera. They are mostly found in tropical areas and are almost all flightless with only seven of the genera having large wings.

== Genera in New Zealand ==
In New Zealand eight Carventinae genera are recognised, six of which are endemic.

- Acaraptera Usinger and Matsuda, 1959
- Carventaptera Usinger and Matsuda, 1959
- Clavaptera Kirman, 1985
- Leuraptera Usinger and Matsuda, 1959
- Lissaptera Usinger and Matsuda, 1959
- Modicarventus Kirman, 1989
- Neocarventus Usinger and Matsuda, 1959
- Tuataraptera Larivière and Larochelle, 1989
