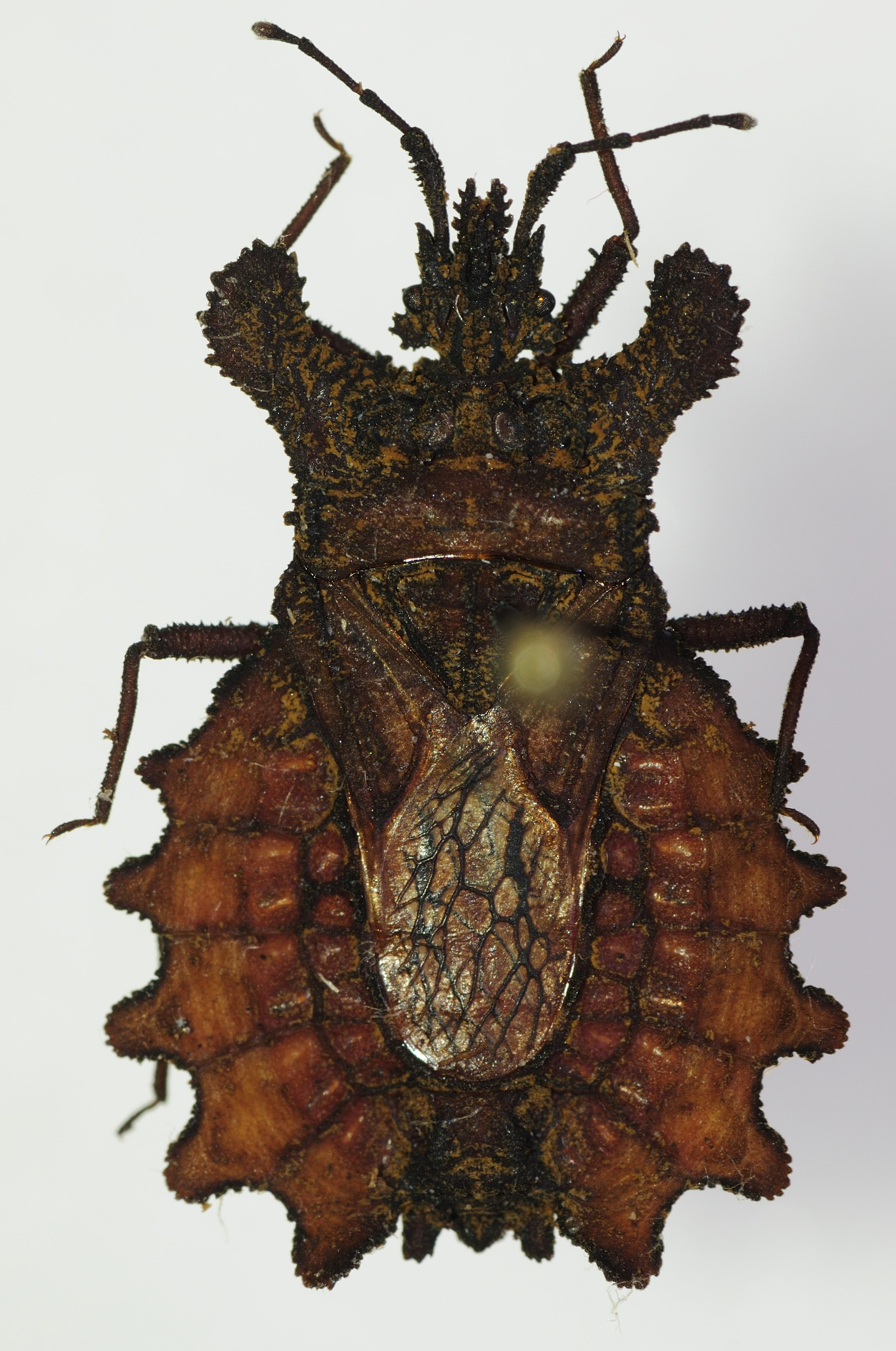
- Dysodius lunatus

Scientific classification
- Kingdom: Animalia
- Phylum: Arthropoda
- Clade: Pancrustacea
- Class: Insecta
- Order: Hemiptera
- Suborder: Heteroptera
- Infraorder: Pentatomomorpha
- Superfamily: Aradoidea
- Family: Aradidae; Spinola, 1837

Subfamilies
- Aneurinae; Aradinae; Calisiinae; Carventinae; Chinamyersiinae; Isoderminae; Mezirinae; Prosympiestinae

= Aradidae =

Aradidae Temporal range: Cretaceous–Recent

Family of insects

Aradidae is a family of true bugs (Heteroptera). Family members are commonly known as flat bugs due to their dorsoventrally flattened bodies. With few exceptions, these cryptic insects are of no economic importance.

Aradids are 3 to 11 mm long and mostly blackish or brownish. Some species have short or reduced wings and they are often appear to have rough surface made from layers of fine debris held by hairs. This family occurs worldwide, with the most diversity occurring in Australia. Temperate species commonly live under the bark of dead trees, while many tropical species are found in leaf litter or on fallen twigs or branches. Adults have long coiled maxillary and mandibular stylets that may be five times the length of the body when uncoiled during feeding. They lack ocelli and the labia have four segments. The tarsi are two segmented. Females are often brachypterous or apterous while males are usually macropterous. The metathoracing scent glands are well developed. The legs are sometimes modified for stridulation with scrapers on the femur and files on the tibia. Stridulatory combs can occur on the fourth ventrite.

Most family members are thought to be mycophagous (fungus eating), but little is known of the feeding habits of most species. They can be attracted to the pheromones of bark beetles. Some aradids have been found in the nests of birds and rodents. Most species breed twice a year. The males stay on top of egg masses after the female lays them. Hexagonal reticulation is found on the eggshells.. A specific type of bug known as [Aradus borealis] is a flat bug.
