= Neuroctenus pseudonymus =

Scientific classification
- Domain: Eukaryota
- Kingdom: Animalia
- Phylum: Arthropoda
- Class: Insecta
- Order: Hemiptera
- Suborder: Heteroptera
- Family: Aradidae
- Subfamily: Mezirinae
- Genus: Neuroctenus
- Species: N. pseudonymus

Binomial name
- Neuroctenus pseudonymus Bergroth, 1898

Species of true bug

Neuroctenus pseudonymus is a species of flat bug in the family Aradidae. It is found in the Caribbean Sea and North America.
