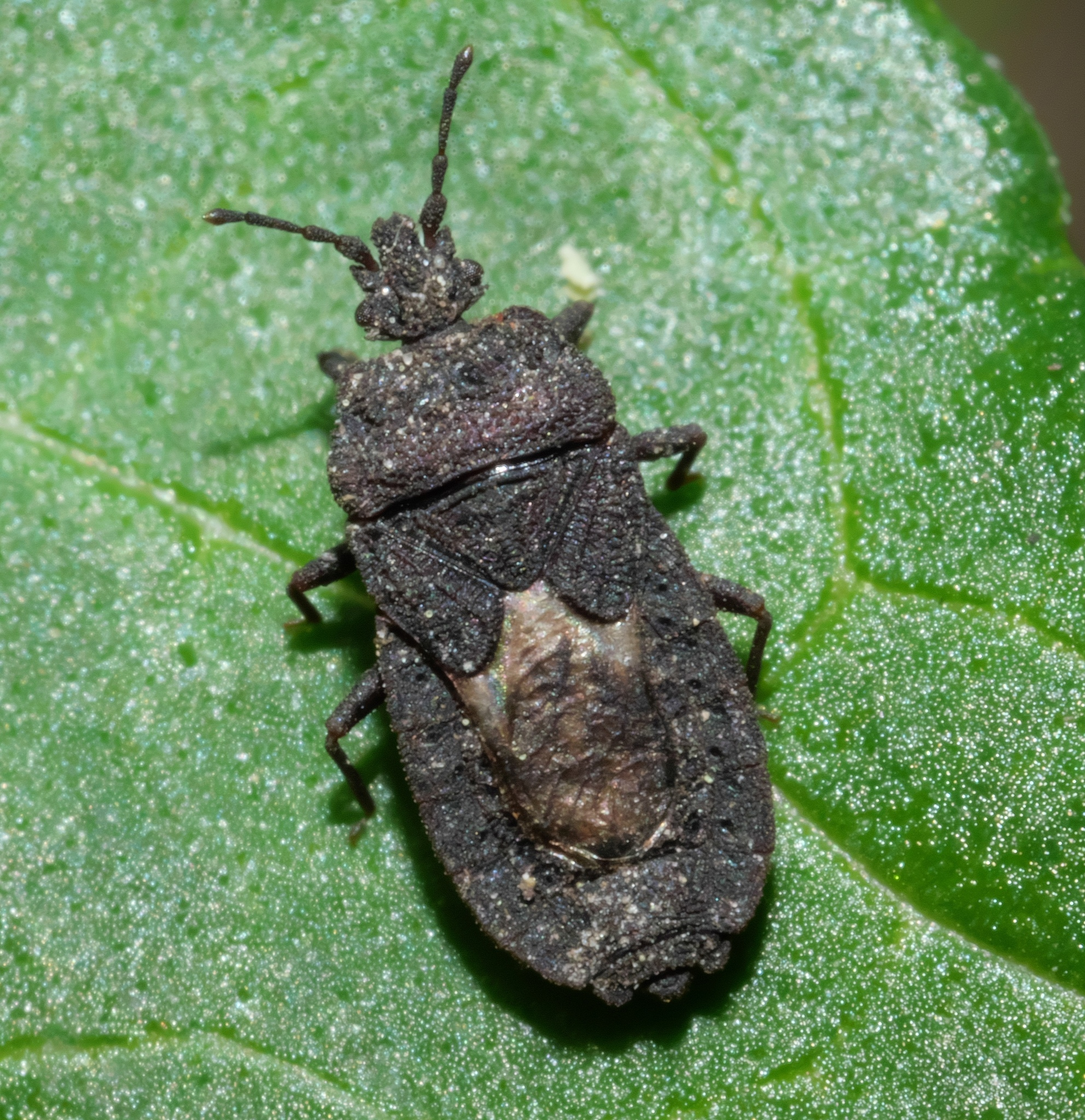
- Mezira granulata, Oklahoma

Scientific classification
- Domain: Eukaryota
- Kingdom: Animalia
- Phylum: Arthropoda
- Class: Insecta
- Order: Hemiptera
- Suborder: Heteroptera
- Family: Aradidae
- Subfamily: Mezirinae
- Genus: Mezira
- Species: M. granulata

Binomial name
- Mezira granulata (Say, 1832)

= Mezira granulata =

Species of true bug

Mezira granulata is a species of flat bug in the family Aradidae. It is found in the Caribbean Sea, Central America, and North America.
