= Mezira sayi =

Scientific classification
- Domain: Eukaryota
- Kingdom: Animalia
- Phylum: Arthropoda
- Class: Insecta
- Order: Hemiptera
- Suborder: Heteroptera
- Family: Aradidae
- Subfamily: Mezirinae
- Genus: Mezira
- Species: M. sayi

Binomial name
- Mezira sayi Kormilev, 1982

Species of true bug

Mezira sayi is a species of flat bug in the family Aradidae. It is found in North America.
