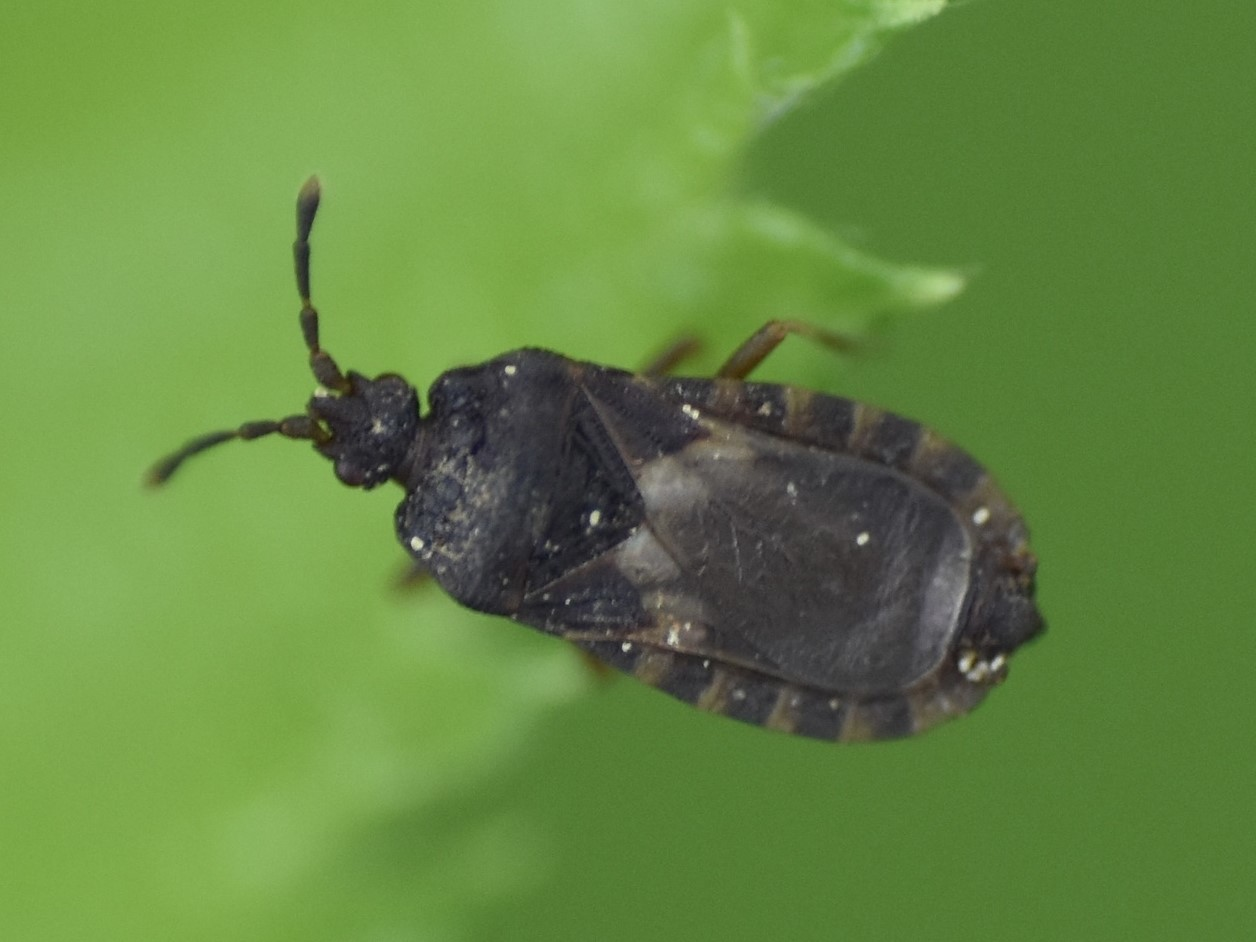

Scientific classification
- Kingdom: Animalia
- Phylum: Arthropoda
- Class: Insecta
- Order: Hemiptera
- Suborder: Heteroptera
- Family: Aradidae
- Subfamily: Mezirinae
- Genus: Notapictinus
- Species: N. aurivillii

Binomial name
- Notapictinus aurivillii (Bergroth, 1887)

= Notapictinus aurivillii =

Species of true bug

Notapictinus aurivillii is a species of flat bug in the family Aradidae. It is found in North America.
