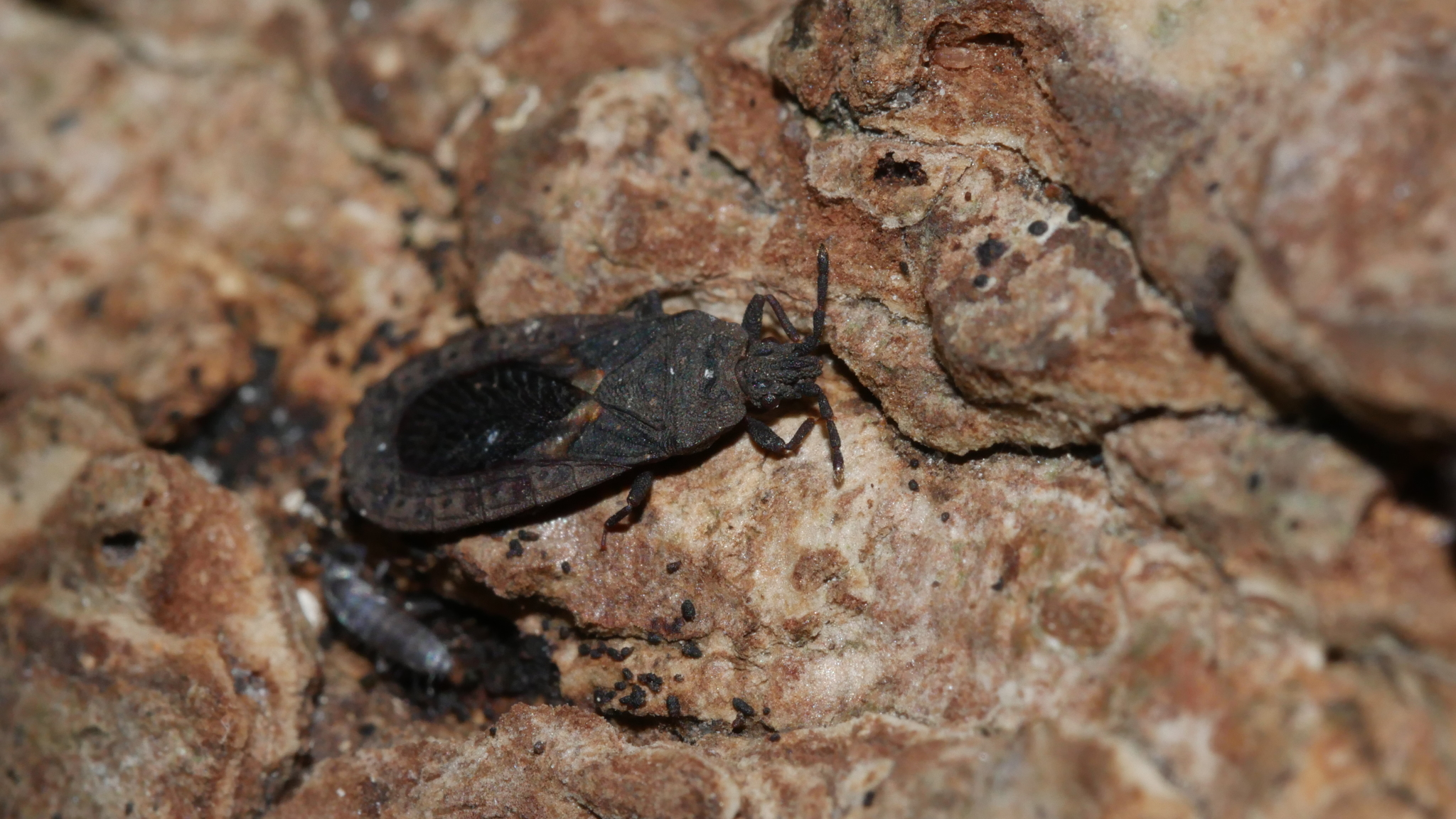

Scientific classification
- Domain: Eukaryota
- Kingdom: Animalia
- Phylum: Arthropoda
- Class: Insecta
- Order: Hemiptera
- Suborder: Heteroptera
- Family: Aradidae
- Subfamily: Mezirinae
- Genus: Neuroctenus
- Species: N. hopkinsi

Binomial name
- Neuroctenus hopkinsi Heidemann, 1904

= Neuroctenus hopkinsi =

Species of true bug

Neuroctenus hopkinsi is a species of flat bug in the family Aradidae. It is found in North America.
