= Neuroctenus elongatus =

Scientific classification
- Domain: Eukaryota
- Kingdom: Animalia
- Phylum: Arthropoda
- Class: Insecta
- Order: Hemiptera
- Suborder: Heteroptera
- Family: Aradidae
- Subfamily: Mezirinae
- Genus: Neuroctenus
- Species: N. elongatus

Binomial name
- Neuroctenus elongatus Osborn, 1903

Species of true bug

Neuroctenus elongatus is a species of flat bug in the family Aradidae. It is found in North America.
