= Neuroctenus simplex =

Scientific classification
- Domain: Eukaryota
- Kingdom: Animalia
- Phylum: Arthropoda
- Class: Insecta
- Order: Hemiptera
- Suborder: Heteroptera
- Family: Aradidae
- Subfamily: Mezirinae
- Genus: Neuroctenus
- Species: N. simplex

Binomial name
- Neuroctenus simplex (Uhler, 1876)

Species of true bug

Neuroctenus simplex is a species of flat bug in the family Aradidae. It is found in the Caribbean and North America.
