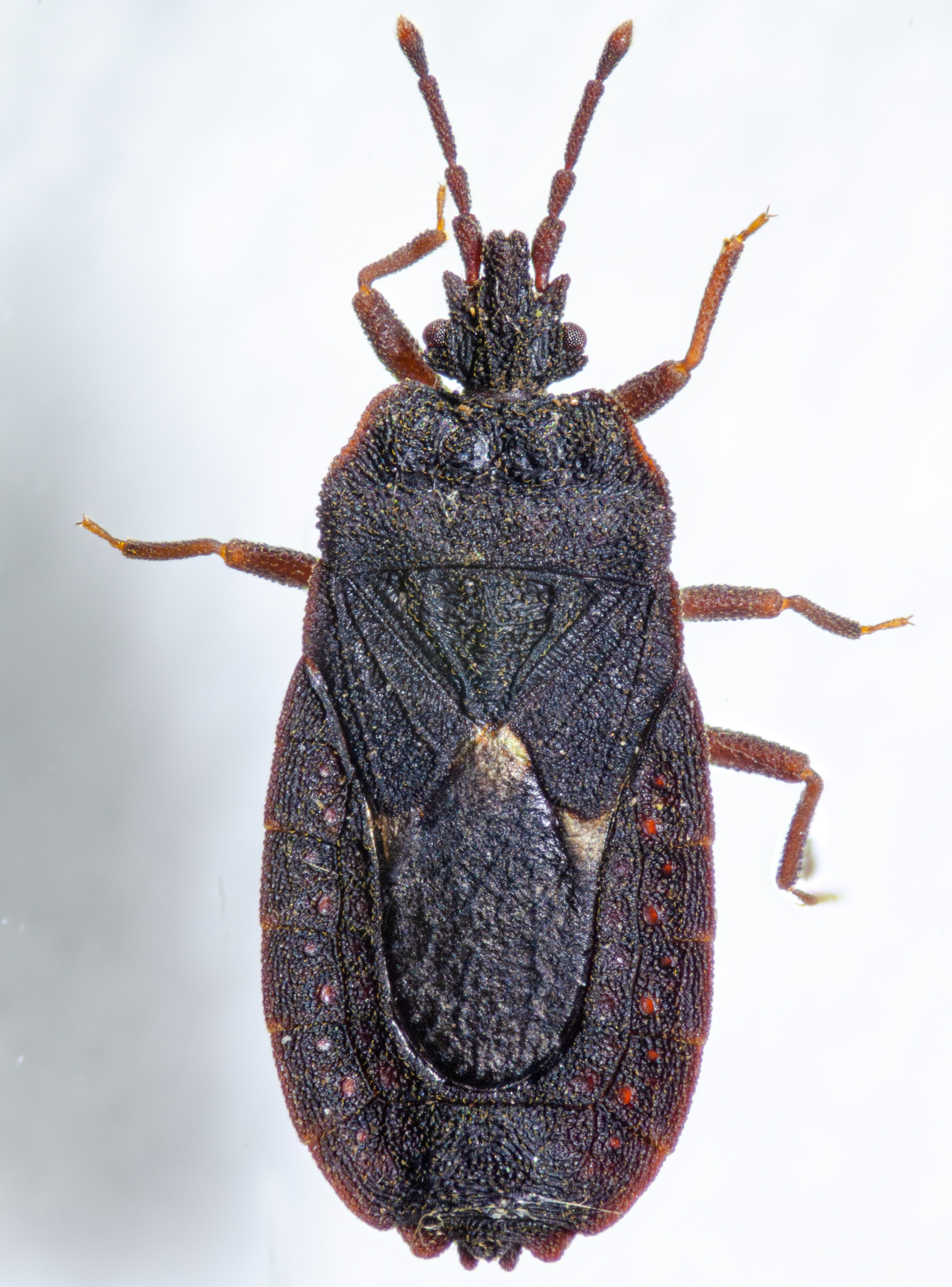

Scientific classification
- Kingdom: Animalia
- Phylum: Arthropoda
- Clade: Pancrustacea
- Class: Insecta
- Order: Hemiptera
- Suborder: Heteroptera
- Family: Aradidae
- Genus: Mezira
- Species: M. pacifica

Binomial name
- Mezira pacifica Usinger, 1936

= Mezira pacifica =

Species of true bug

Mezira pacifica is a species of flat bug in the family Aradidae. It is found in western North America.
