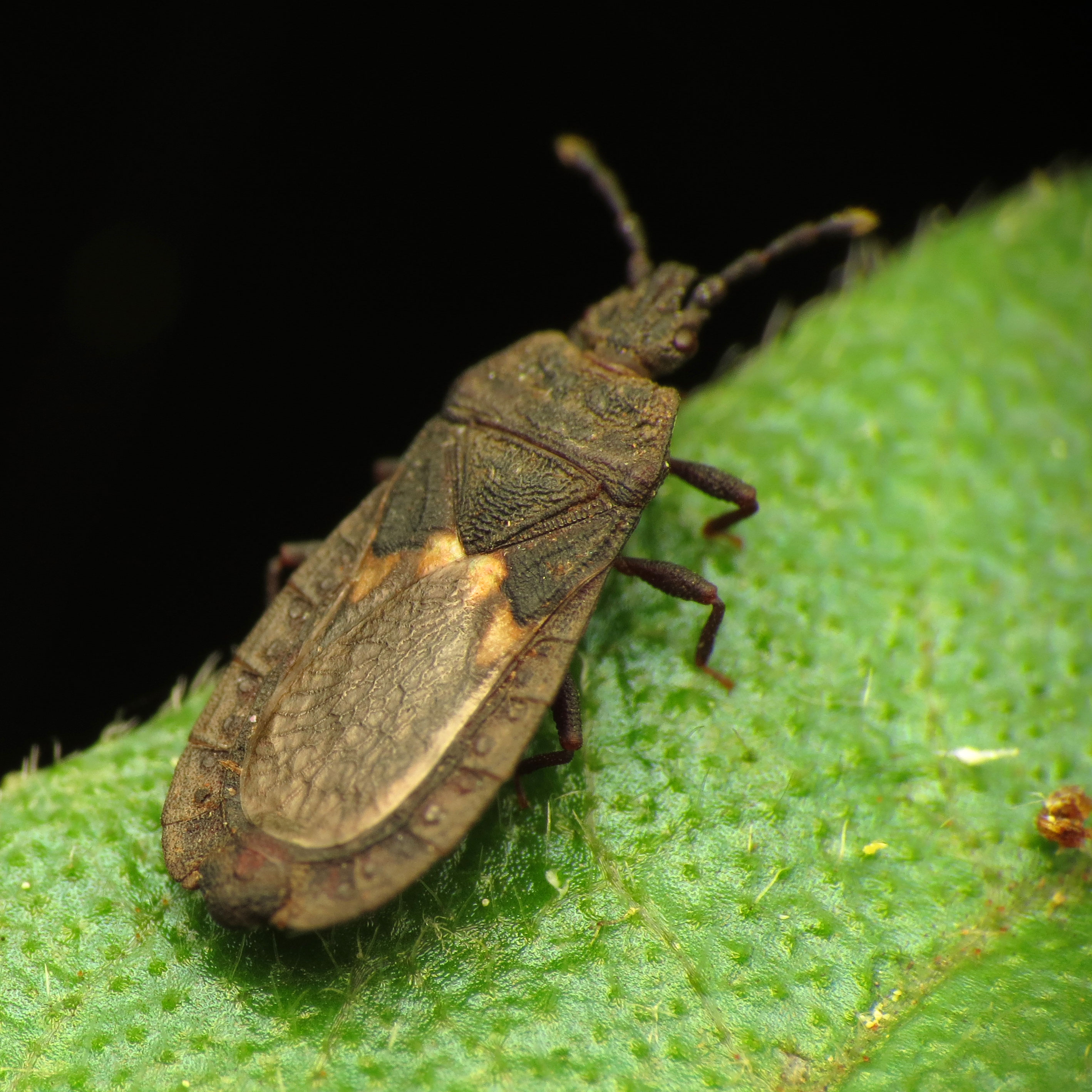
- Neuroctenus species

Scientific classification
- Domain: Eukaryota
- Kingdom: Animalia
- Phylum: Arthropoda
- Class: Insecta
- Order: Hemiptera
- Suborder: Heteroptera
- Family: Aradidae
- Subfamily: Mezirinae
- Genus: Neuroctenus; Fieber, 1860

Species
- See text

= Neuroctenus =

Genus of true bugs

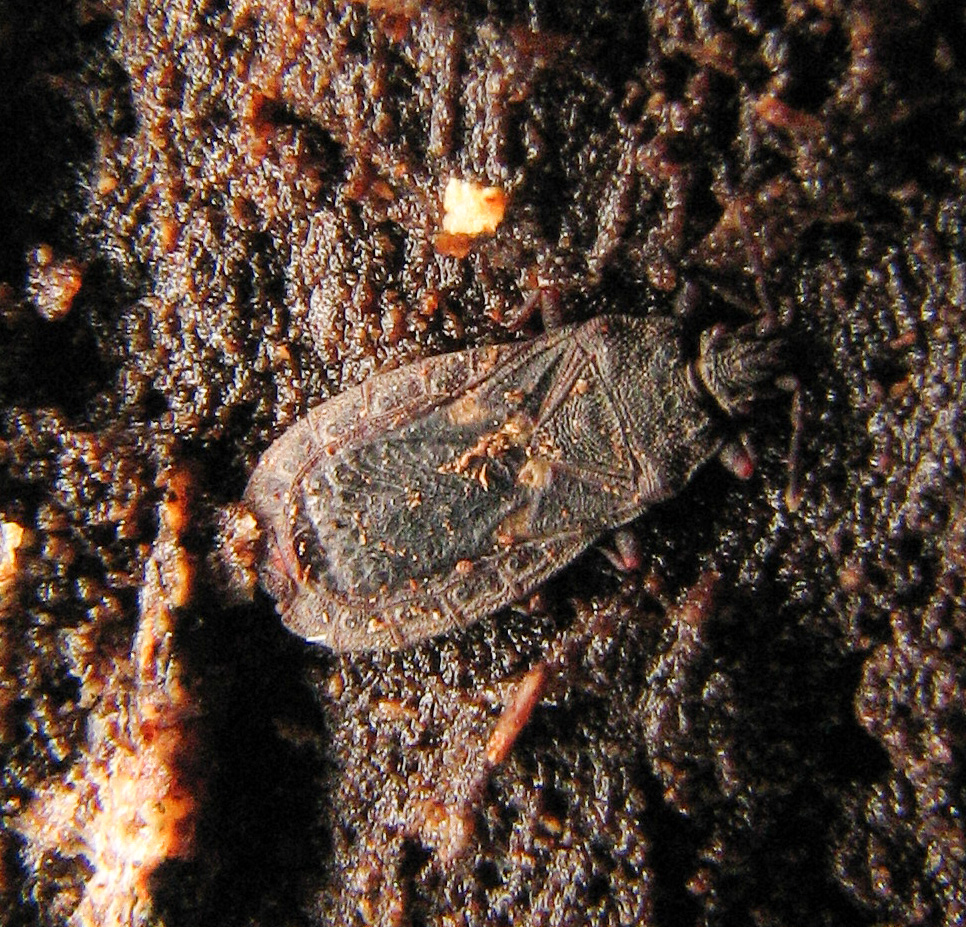
Neuroctenus sp., male, overwintering under bark

Neuroctenus is a genus of flat bugs in the Aradidae subfamily Mezirinae. There are about 7 described species in Neuroctenus.

== Species ==
- Neuroctenus arizonicus Kormilev, 1982
- Neuroctenus elongatus Osborn, 1903
- Neuroctenus hopkinsi Heidemann, 1904
- Neuroctenus pseudonymus Bergroth, 1898
- Neuroctenus punctulatus (Burmeister, 1835)
- Neuroctenus simplex (Uhler, 1876)
- Neuroctenus unistellatus Vásárhelyi, 1994
