= Ambohitanyela =

Scientific classification
- Kingdom: Animalia
- Phylum: Arthropoda
- Class: Insecta
- Order: Hemiptera
- Suborder: Heteroptera
- Family: Aradidae
- Subfamily: Mezirinae
- Genus: Ambohitanyela; Heiss & Banar, 2013
- Species: A. yuripopovi

Binomial name
- Ambohitanyela yuripopovi Heiss & Banar, 2013

Genus of true bugs

Ambohitanyela is a genus of flat bugs which contains the single species Ambohitanyela yuripopovi from Madagascar.
