= Notapictinus =

Scientific classification
- Domain: Eukaryota
- Kingdom: Animalia
- Phylum: Arthropoda
- Class: Insecta
- Order: Hemiptera
- Suborder: Heteroptera
- Family: Aradidae
- Subfamily: Mezirinae
- Genus: Notapictinus; Usinger & Matsuda, 1959

Genus of true bugs

Notapictinus is a genus of flat bugs in the family Aradidae. There are about 12 described species in Notapictinus.

== Species ==
These 12 species belong to the genus Notapictinus:

- Notapictinus aurivillii (Bergroth, 1887)
- Notapictinus dominicus (Usinger, 1936)
- Notapictinus martinezi Kormilev, 1953
- Notapictinus micropterus Kormilev
- Notapictinus ornatus Kormilev
- Notapictinus paramaculatus Kormilev
- Notapictinus parvulus Kormilev
- Notapictinus platyceps Kormilev
- Notapictinus plaumani Kormilev
- Notapictinus sanmigueli Kormilev, 1959
- Notapictinus terminalis Kormilev
- Notapictinus uruguayensis Kormilev
