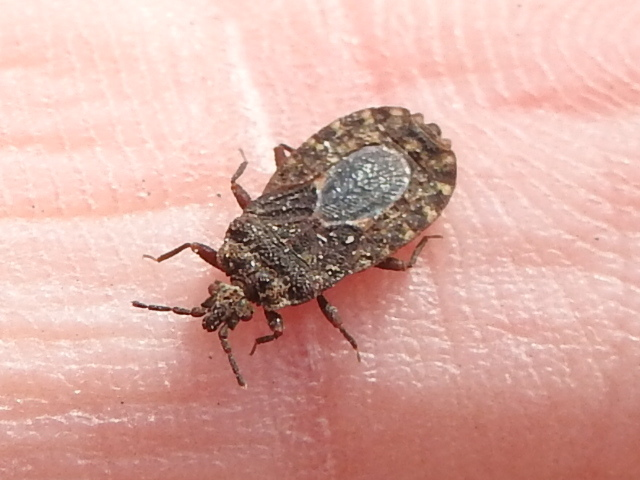

Scientific classification
- Kingdom: Animalia
- Phylum: Arthropoda
- Clade: Pancrustacea
- Class: Insecta
- Order: Hemiptera
- Suborder: Heteroptera
- Family: Aradidae
- Genus: Mezira
- Species: M. emarginata

Binomial name
- Mezira emarginata (Say, 1832)

= Mezira emarginata =

Species of true bug

Mezira emarginata is a species of flat bug in the family Aradidae. It is found in Central America and North America.
