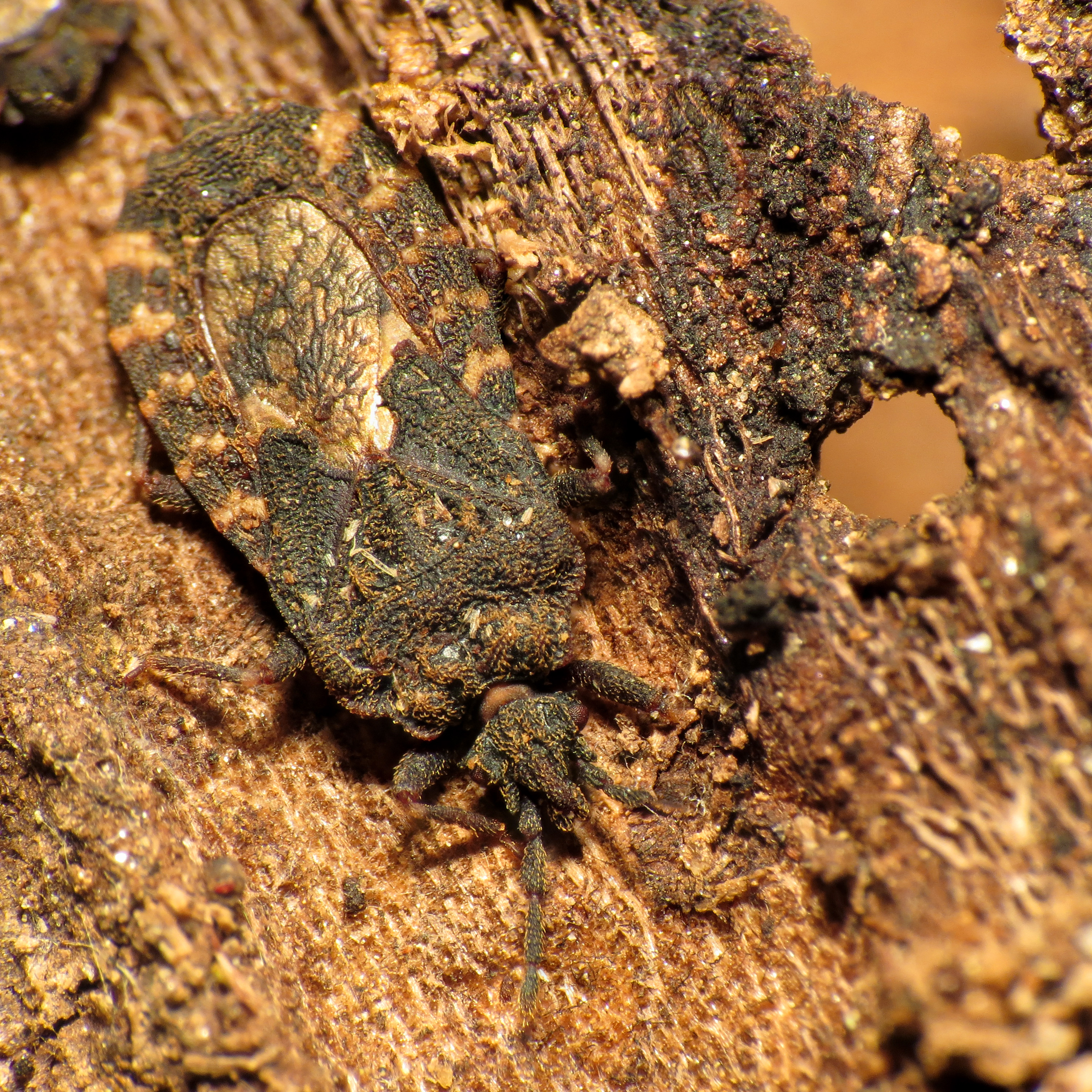
- Mezira subsetosa

Scientific classification
- Domain: Eukaryota
- Kingdom: Animalia
- Phylum: Arthropoda
- Class: Insecta
- Order: Hemiptera
- Suborder: Heteroptera
- Family: Aradidae
- Subfamily: Mezirinae
- Genus: Mezira; Amyot & Serville, 1843

= Mezira =

Genus of true bugs

Mezira is a genus of flat bugs in the family Aradidae. There are more than 70 described species in Mezira.

== Species ==
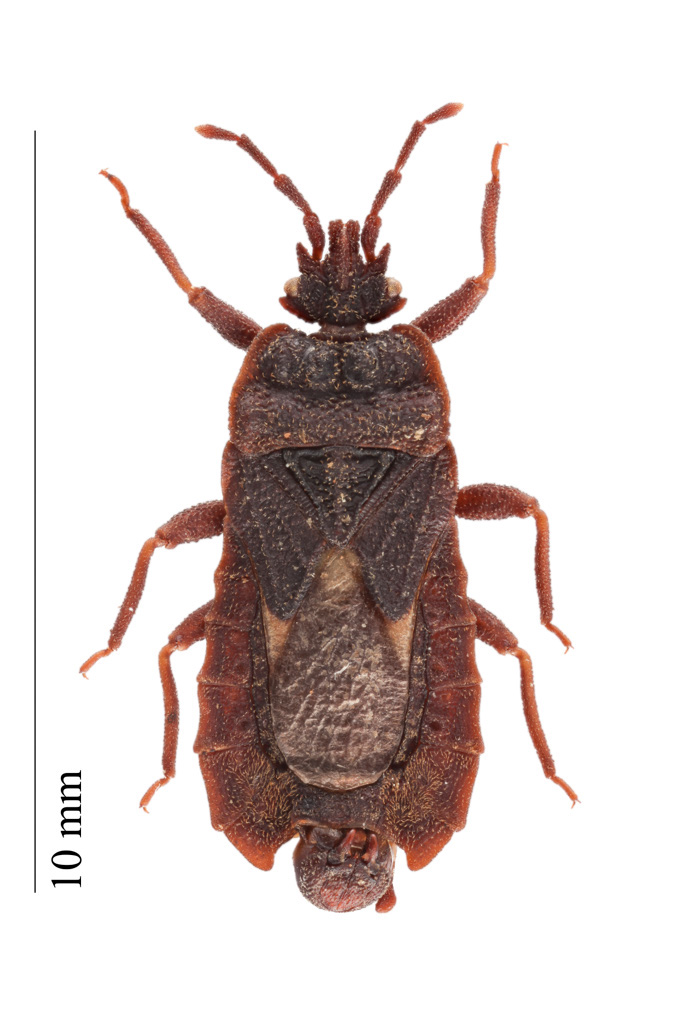
Mezira tremulae

These 79 species belong to the genus Mezira:

- Mezira americana Spinola, 1852
- Mezira argentinensis Kormilev
- Mezira barberi Kormilev, 1964
- Mezira beta Kormilev
- Mezira bicolor Hoberlandt, 1963
- Mezira birabeni Kormilev
- Mezira boliviana Kormilev
- Mezira bonaerensis Kormilev
- Mezira brasiliensis Kormilev
- Mezira bruchi Kormilev, 1953
- Mezira carioca Kormilev
- Mezira championi Kormilev
- Mezira chemsaki Kormilev, 1982
- Mezira crenulata Kormilev
- Mezira cubana Kormilev
- Mezira drakei Hoberlandt, 1957
- Mezira emarginata (Say, 1832)
- Mezira equatoriana Kormilev
- Mezira eurycephala Kormilev
- Mezira formosa Kormilev, 1953
- Mezira fritzi Kormilev
- Mezira froeschneri Davidová-Vilímová, Taylor & McPherson, 1996
- Mezira germari
- Mezira ghanaensis Kormilev
- Mezira granulata (Say, 1832)
- Mezira granuliger Stal, 1860
- Mezira guanacastensis Kormilev, 1982
- Mezira guianensis Kormilev
- Mezira handlirschi (Bergroth, 1898)
- Mezira hondurensis Kormilev, 1982
- Mezira insularis Hoberlandt, 1963
- Mezira kiritshenkoi Hoberlandt, 1963
- Mezira laeviventris (Champion, 1898)
- Mezira lobata (Say, 1832)
- Mezira luteomaculata Kormilev, 1957
- Mezira luteonotata Kormilev
- Mezira membranacea (Fabricius, 1803)
- Mezira mexicana Kormilev
- Mezira minima Montrouzier, 1861
- Mezira minor Kormilev
- Mezira neonigripennis
- Mezira nigripennis Usinger, 1936
- Mezira novella Blatchley, 1924
- Mezira pacifica Usinger, 1936
- Mezira paraensis Kormilev & Heiss, 1979
- Mezira paragranuliger Kormilev, 1953
- Mezira paraguayensis Kormilev
- Mezira paralata Kormilev
- Mezira parva Hoberlandt, 1957
- Mezira pauperula Kormilev, 1962
- Mezira piligera Kormilev, 1971
- Mezira pilosula Kormilev, 1973
- Mezira placida Kormilev
- Mezira plaumanni Kormilev
- Mezira proseni Kormilev, 1953
- Mezira pusilla Kormilev
- Mezira reducta Van Duzee, 1927
- Mezira regularis Champion, 1898
- Mezira reuteri Bergroth, 1886
- Mezira saltensis Kormilev, 1953
- Mezira sanmartini Kormilev
- Mezira sayi Kormilev, 1982
- Mezira scrupulosa
- Mezira singularis Hoberlandt, 1957
- Mezira smithi Kormilev, 1982
- Mezira spissigrada Kormilev
- Mezira subsetosa
- Mezira tartagalensis Kormilev
- Mezira tremulae (Germar, 1822)
- Mezira trinidadensis Kormilev
- Mezira vanduzeei Usinger, 1936
- Mezira vianai Kormilev, 1953
- † Mezira crassifemur Wappler & Heiss, 2006
- † Mezira eckfeldensis Wappler & Heiss, 2006
- † Mezira eocenica Wappler & Heiss, 2006
- † Mezira parapetrificata Heiss & al., 2015
- † Mezira petrificata Heiss & al., 2015
- † Mezira scheveni Heiss, 2000
- † Mezira succinica Usinger, 1941
