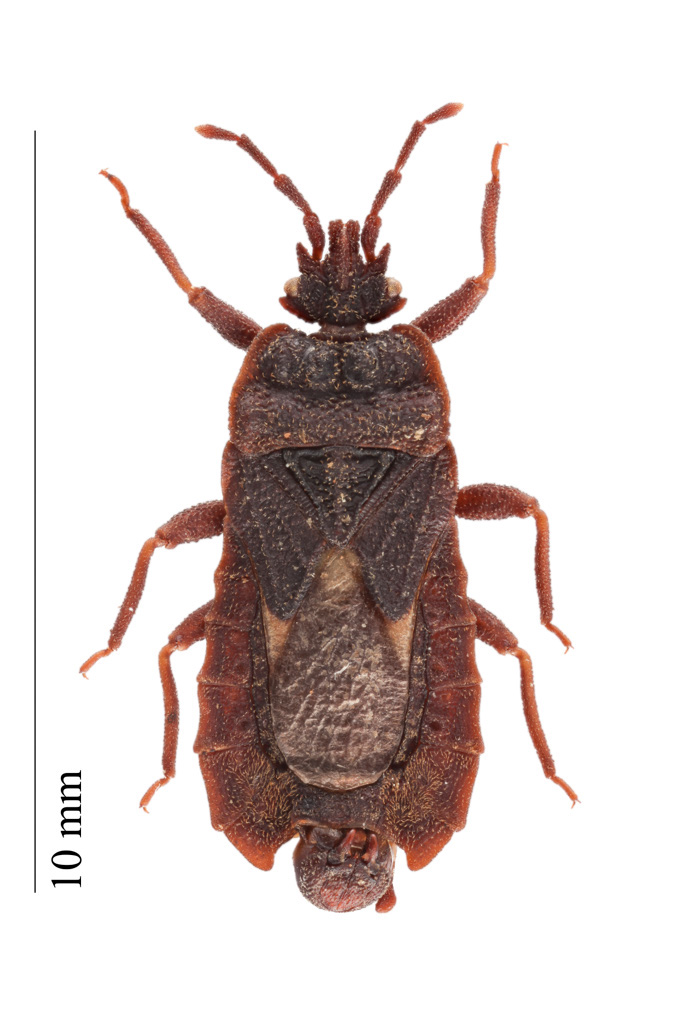
- Mezira tremulae

Scientific classification
- Domain: Eukaryota
- Kingdom: Animalia
- Phylum: Arthropoda
- Class: Insecta
- Order: Hemiptera
- Suborder: Heteroptera
- Family: Aradidae
- Subfamily: Mezirinae; Oshanin, 1908

Genera
- See text

= Mezirinae =

Mezirinae Temporal range: Cenomanian–Recent

Subfamily of true bugs

Mezirinae is a subfamily of flat bug. It is distributed globally. The subfamily contains more than 1120 described species in 124 genera.

== Genera ==
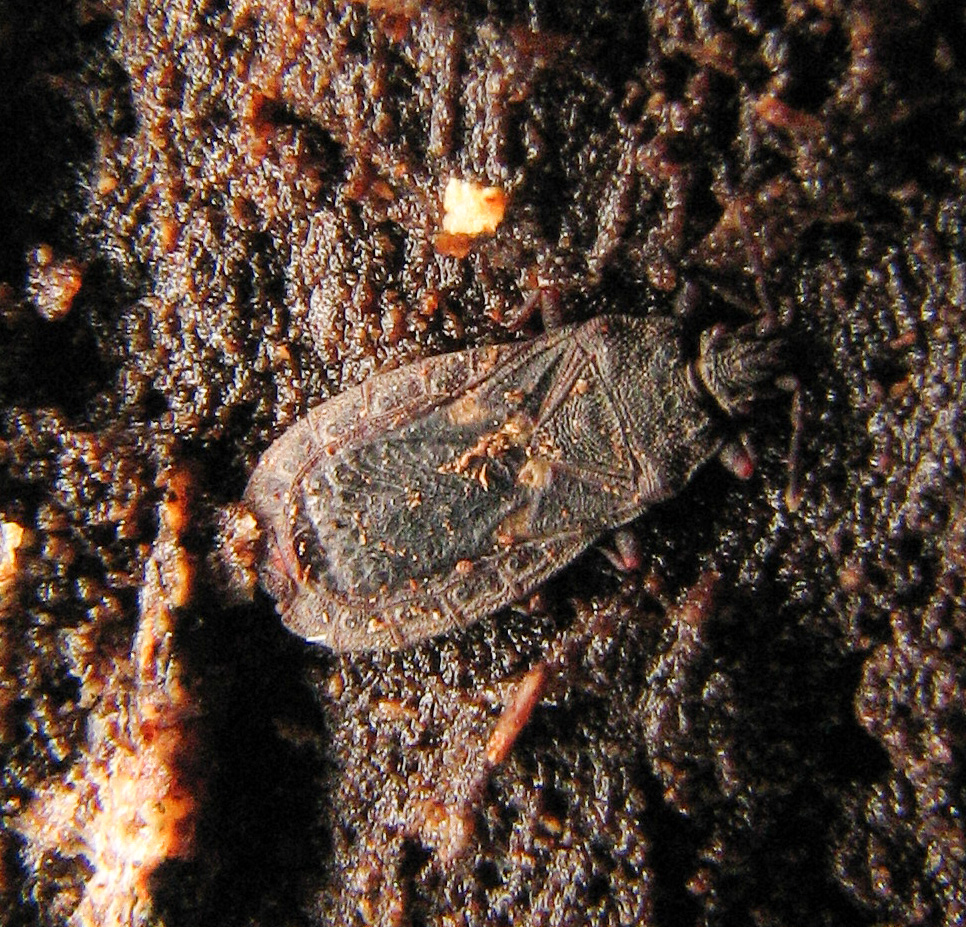
Neuroctenus sp. overwintering under bark

- Ambohitanyela Heiss & Banar, 2013
- †Aphleboderrhis Stål, 1860
- †Brevisensoria Poinar, 2011 Dominican amber, Miocene
- Mezira Amyot & Serville, 1843
- †Myanmezira Heiss and Poinar 2012 Burmese amber, Myanmar, Cenomanian
- Nannium Bergroth, 1898
- Neuroctenus Fieber, 1860
- Notapictinus Usinger & Matsuda, 1959
