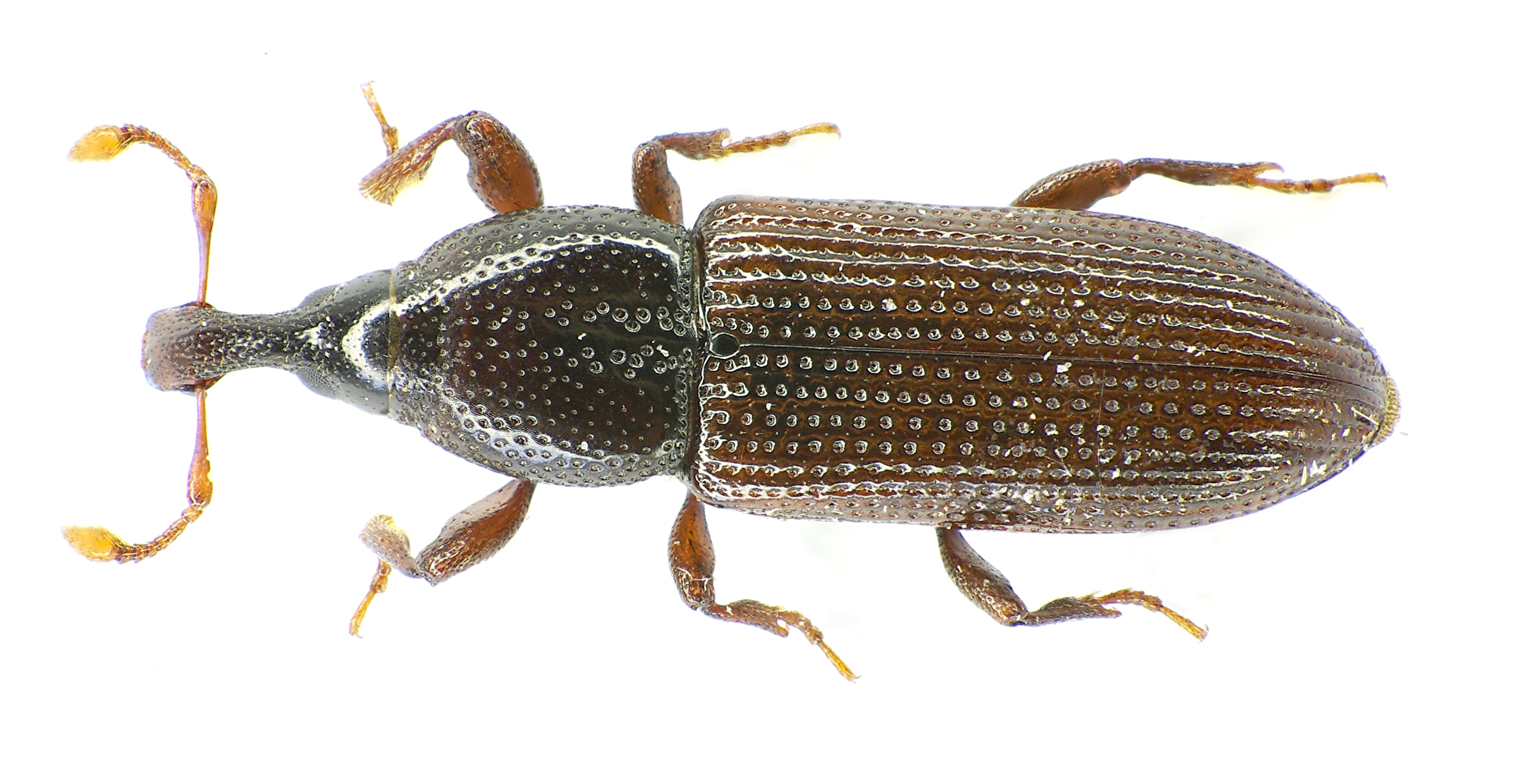
- Cossonus linearis from Southern Germany

Scientific classification
- Kingdom: Animalia
- Phylum: Arthropoda
- Clade: Pancrustacea
- Class: Insecta
- Order: Coleoptera
- Suborder: Polyphaga
- Infraorder: Cucujiformia
- Superfamily: Curculionoidea
- Family: Curculionidae
- Subfamily: Cossoninae; Schönherr, 1825

= Cossoninae =

Subfamily of beetles

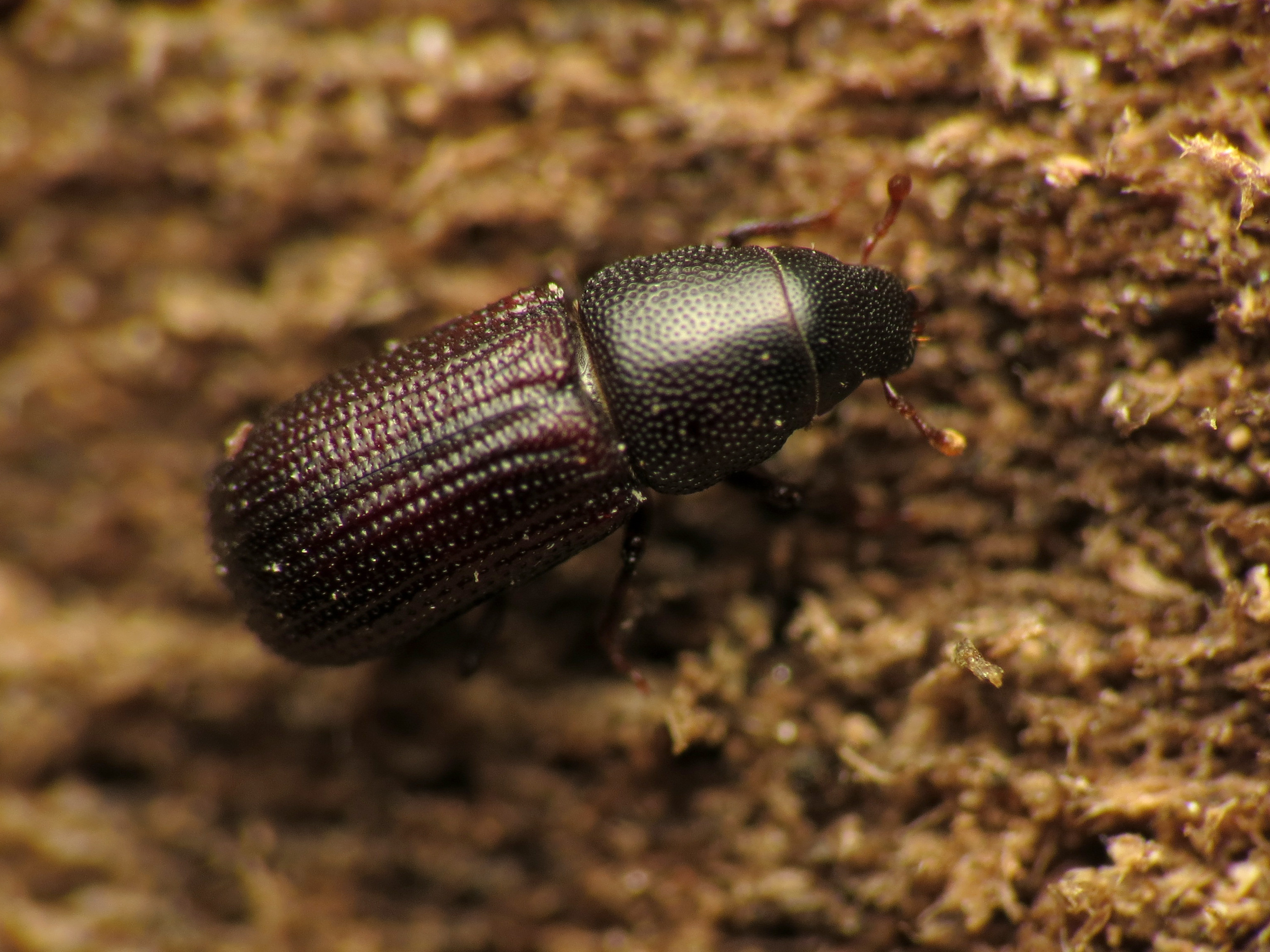
Stenoscelis brevis

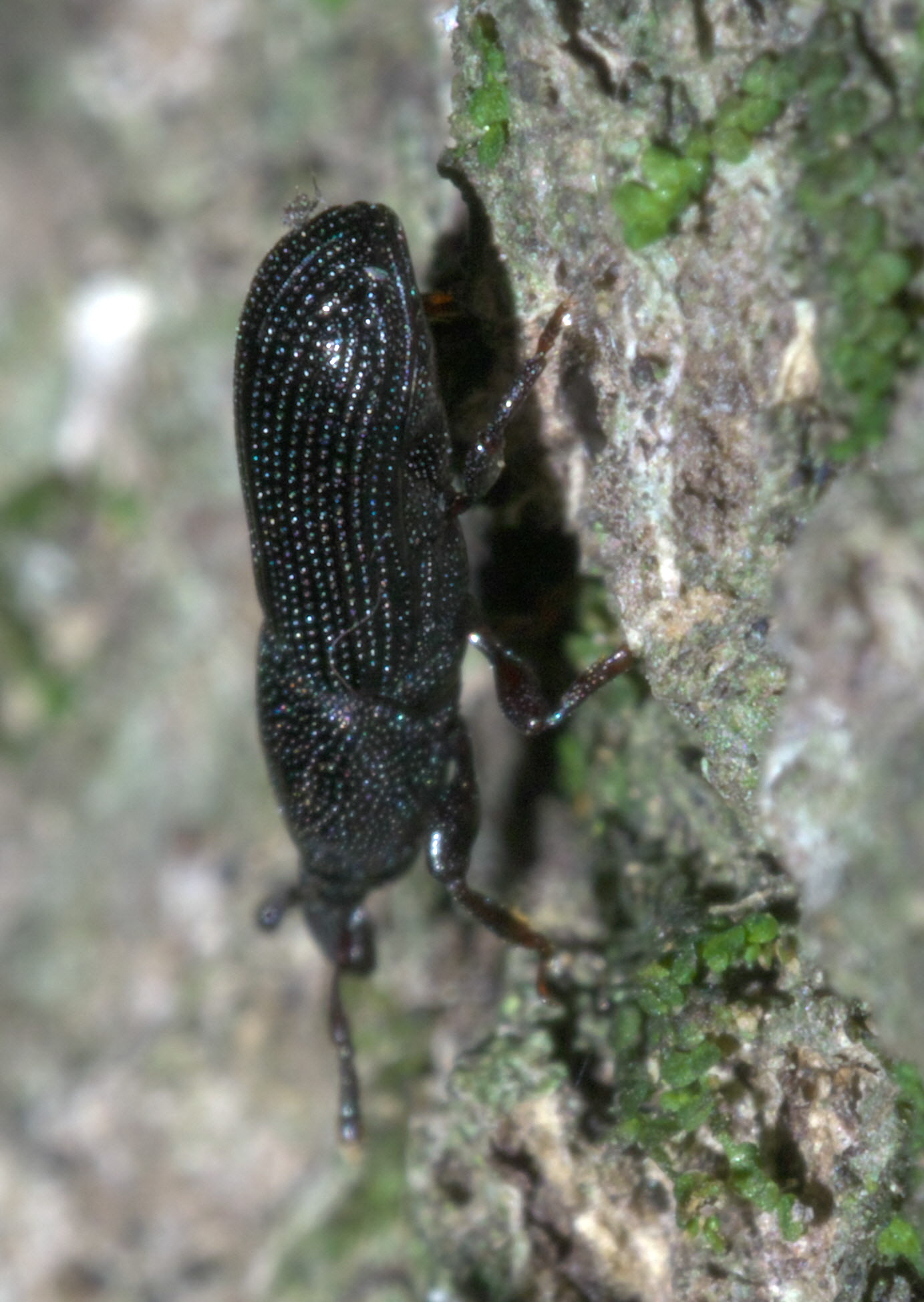
Cossonus

Cossoninae is a true weevil subfamily in the family Curculionidae.

== Tribes ==
- Acamptini LeConte, 1876
- Acanthinomerini Voss, 1972
- Allomorphini Folwaczny, 1973
- Aphyllurini Voss, 1955
- Araucariini Kuschel, 1966
- Choerorhinini Folwaczny, 1973
- Cossonini Schönherr, 1825
- Cryptommatini Voss, 1972
- Dryotribini LeConte, 1876
- Microxylobiini Voss, 1972
- Nesiobiini Alonso-Zarazaga and Lyal, 1999
- Neumatorini Folwaczny, 1973
- Onychiini Chapuis, 1869
- Onycholipini Wollaston, 1873
- Pentarthrini Lacordaire, 1865
- Proecini Voss, 1956
- Pseudapotrepini Champion, 1909
- Rhyncolini Gistel, 1848
- Tapiromimini Voss, 1972

== Genera ==
These genera (and probably more) belong to the subfamily Cossoninae:

- Acamptus LeConte, 1876^{i c g b}
- Amaurorhinus Fairmaire, 1860^{c g b}
- Aphanommata Wollaston, 1873^{c g b}
- Apotrepus Casey, 1892^{i c g b}
- Carphonotus Casey, 1892^{i c g b}
- Caulophilus Wollaston, 1854^{i c g b}
- Cossonus Clairville, 1798^{i c g b}
- Dryotribus Horn, 1873^{i c g b}
- Elassoptes Horn, 1873^{i c g b}
- Euophryum Broun, 1909^{c g b}
- Hexarthrum Wollaston, 1860^{i c g b}
- Himatium Wollaston, 1873^{i c g b}
- Macrancylus LeConte, 1876^{i c g b}
- Macrorhyncolus Wollaston, 1873^{c g b}
- Macroscytalus Broun, 1881^{c g b}
- Mesites Schönherr, 1838^{i c g b}
- Micromimus Wollaston, 1873^{i c g b}
- Nyssonotus Casey, 1892^{i c g b}
- Paralicus O'Brien, 1984^{c g b}
- Pentarthrum Wollaston, 1854^{i c g b}
- Phloeophagus Schönherr, 1838^{i c g b}
- Proeces Schönherr, 1838^{c g b}
- Pselactus Broun, 1886^{i c g b}
- Pseudopentarthrum Wollaston, 1873^{i c g b}
- Rhyncolus Germar, 1817^{i c g b}
- Stenancylus Casey, 1892^{i c g b}
- Stenomimus Wollaston, 1873^{i c g b}
- Stenoscelis Wollaston, 1861^{i c g b}
- Stenotrupis Wollaston, 1873^{i c g b}
- Tomolips Wollaston, 1873^{i c g b}
- Trichacorynus Blatchley, 1916^{i c g b}

Data sources: i = ITIS, c = Catalogue of Life, g = GBIF, b = Bugguide.net
