= Mesites =

Mesites may refer to:

- the plural of mesite (Mesitornithidae); a family of birds of uncertain affinities.
- Mesites (beetle), a beetle genus in the tribe Cossonini
- Mesites, a disused synonym for a genus of sea cucumbers, Mesothuria
