= Cossonus divisus =

Scientific classification
- Kingdom: Animalia
- Phylum: Arthropoda
- Clade: Pancrustacea
- Class: Insecta
- Order: Coleoptera
- Suborder: Polyphaga
- Infraorder: Cucujiformia
- Superfamily: Curculionoidea
- Family: Curculionidae
- Genus: Cossonus
- Species: C. divisus

Binomial name
- Cossonus divisus Marshall, 1938

Species of beetle

Cossonus divisus, is a species of weevil found in Sri Lanka.

== Description ==
Typical length of the adult is about 3.5 to 4.0 mm.
