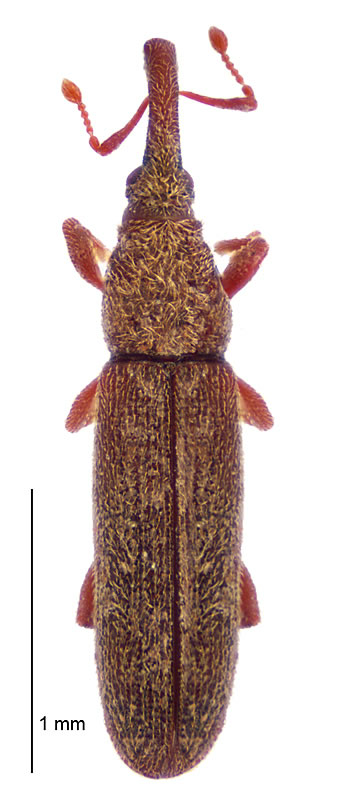
- Agrilochilus prolixus

Scientific classification
- Kingdom: Animalia
- Phylum: Arthropoda
- Clade: Pancrustacea
- Class: Insecta
- Order: Coleoptera
- Suborder: Polyphaga
- Infraorder: Cucujiformia
- Superfamily: Curculionoidea
- Family: Curculionidae
- Subfamily: Cossoninae
- Tribe: Dryotribini; LeConte, 1876

Genera
- See text

= Dryotribini =

Tribe of beetles

Dryotribini is a tribe of beetles in the subfamily Cossoninae.

== Genera ==
Agrilochilus - Allopentarthrum - Amaurorhinus - Ampharthropelma - Arecocryptus - Arecophaga - Atopoxydema - Barretonus - Benius - Caenopentarthrum - Catolethrobius - Catolethrus - Caulophilus - Caulotrupis - Cotaster - Cotasteroloeblia - Dryotribodes - Dryotribus - Echinomorphus - Elgoniella - Entium - Hexacoptus - Howdeniola - Iliolus - Isodryotribus - Lixomimus - Macrorhyncolus - Mahnertia - Microcopes - Micromimus - Microtribodes - Microtribus - Necrodryophthorus - Nesmicrocopes - Ochronanus - Paralicus - Peltophoridus - Pentarthrodes - Pentarthrophasis - Pentatemnodes - Pentatemnus - Pentebathmus - Pogonorhinus - Pseudomesoxenus - Salvagopselactus - Sengletius - Sericotrogus - Stenomimus - Stenotoura - Stenotribus - Stilbocara - Synommatodes - Toura - Trichopentarthrum - Uluguruella - Unas - ?Allaorus - ?Eiratus - ?Etheophanus - ?Exeiratus - ?Paedaretus - ?Stilboderma
