= Cossonus disciferus =

Scientific classification
- Kingdom: Animalia
- Phylum: Arthropoda
- Clade: Pancrustacea
- Class: Insecta
- Order: Coleoptera
- Suborder: Polyphaga
- Infraorder: Cucujiformia
- Superfamily: Curculionoidea
- Family: Curculionidae
- Genus: Cossonus
- Species: C. disciferus

Binomial name
- Cossonus disciferus F.Walker

Species of beetle

Cossonus disciferus is a species of weevil found in Sri Lanka.

== Description ==
Similar to Cossonus ochreipennis. Rostrum elongate. The apex of the rostrum and legs are reddish brown. Apex of elytra is black, and median impression of pronotum interrupted in the middle and not carinate.
