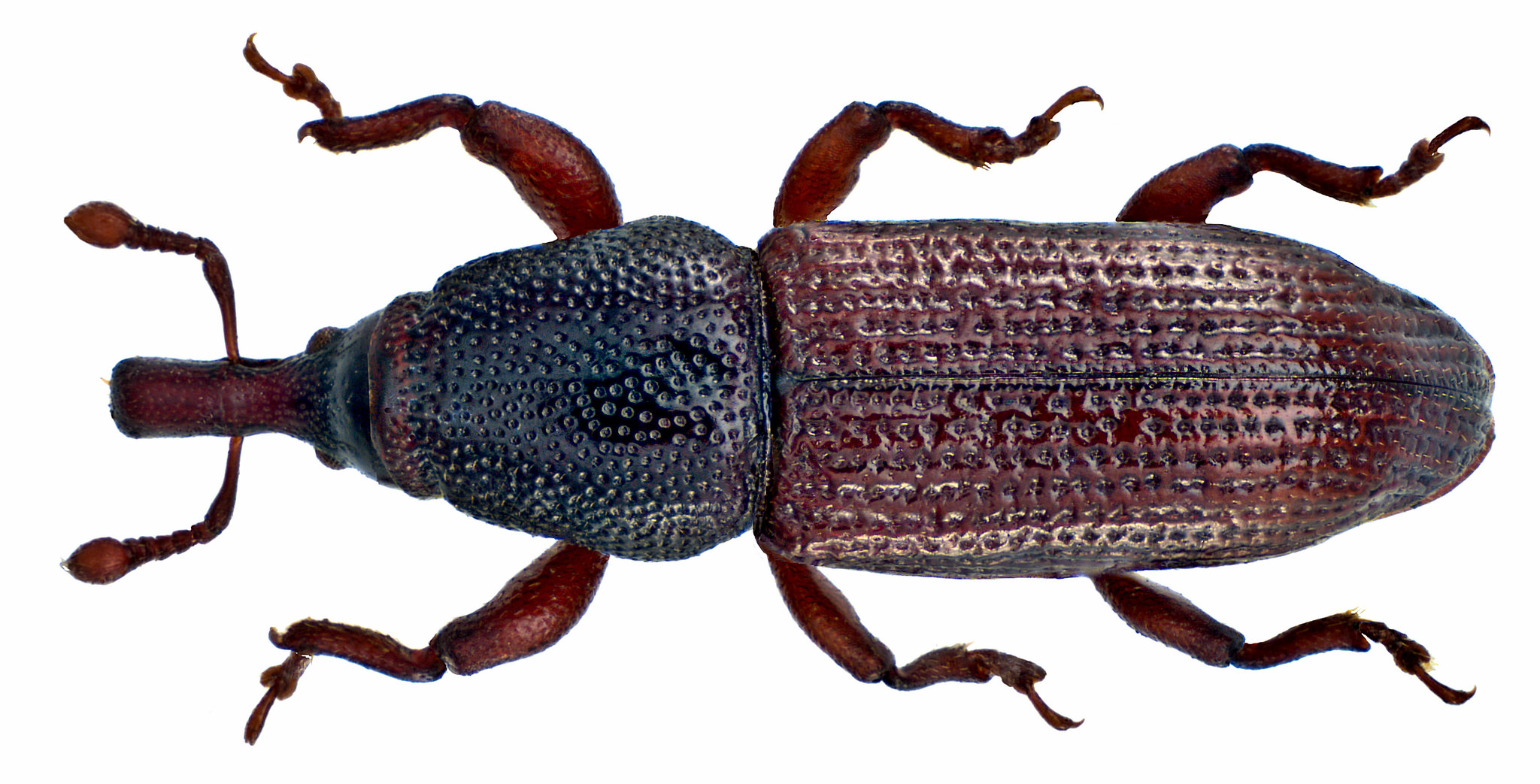
- Pentarthrum huttoni

Scientific classification
- Kingdom: Animalia
- Phylum: Arthropoda
- Clade: Pancrustacea
- Class: Insecta
- Order: Coleoptera
- Suborder: Polyphaga
- Infraorder: Cucujiformia
- Superfamily: Curculionoidea
- Family: Curculionidae
- Subfamily: Cossoninae
- Tribe: Pentarthrini; Lacordaire, 1865

Genera
- See text

= Pentarthrini =

Tribe of beetles

Pentarthrini is a true weevil tribe in the subfamily Cossoninae.

== Genera ==
Adel - Agastegnus - Agitonischius - Camptoscapus - Choerorrhinodes - Conisius - Conlonia - Cossonideus - Eucossonus - Euophryum - Geopentarthrum - Gitonischius - Hypopentarthrum - Leptomimus - Leptommatus - Lyprodes - Macroscytalus - Mesoxenomorphus - Microcossonus - Microtrupis - Morronella - Myrmecorhinus - Neoproconus - Nepalorhynchus - Orothreptes - Pacindonus - Pentarthrocis - Pentarthrum - Proconus - Promicrocossonus - Rhinanisodes - Sphinctocephalus - Stenopentarthrum - Stenotrupis - Tanysoma - Temnorrhamphus - Terminus - Torostoma - Touropsis - Trapezirrhynchus - Tychiodes - Tychiosoma - Xenosomatium - Zenoteratus
