= Cossonus horni =

Scientific classification
- Kingdom: Animalia
- Phylum: Arthropoda
- Clade: Pancrustacea
- Class: Insecta
- Order: Coleoptera
- Suborder: Polyphaga
- Infraorder: Cucujiformia
- Superfamily: Curculionoidea
- Family: Curculionidae
- Genus: Cossonus
- Species: C. horni

Binomial name
- Cossonus horni F.Walker

Species of beetle

Cossonus horni, is a species of weevil found in Sri Lanka.

== Description ==
Typical length of the adult is about 3.2 to 3.6 millimetres (0.13 to 0.14 in).
