= Cossonus piniphilus =

Scientific classification
- Kingdom: Animalia
- Phylum: Arthropoda
- Clade: Pancrustacea
- Class: Insecta
- Order: Coleoptera
- Suborder: Polyphaga
- Infraorder: Cucujiformia
- Superfamily: Curculionoidea
- Family: Curculionidae
- Genus: Cossonus
- Species: C. piniphilus

Binomial name
- Cossonus piniphilus Boheman, 1838

Synonyms
- Cossonus californicus Motschulsky, 1845; Cossonus scrobiculatus LeConte, 1860

Species of beetle

Cossonus piniphilus is a species of true weevil in the beetle family Curculionidae.
