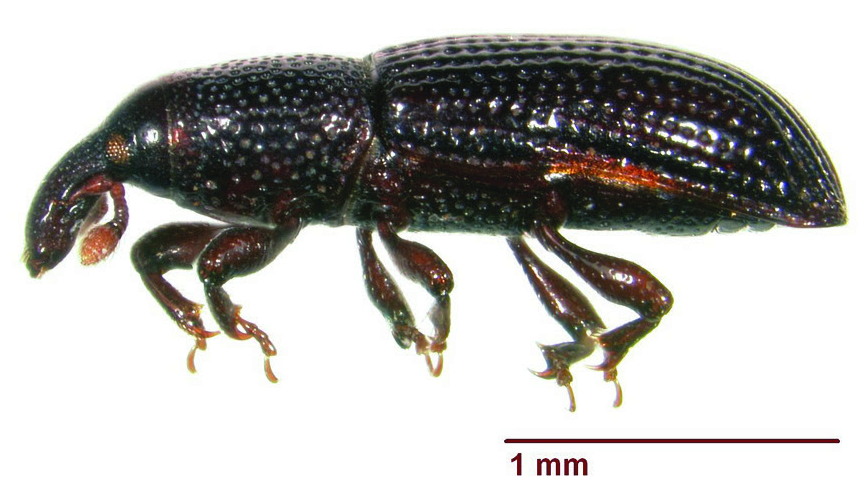

Scientific classification
- Kingdom: Animalia
- Phylum: Arthropoda
- Clade: Pancrustacea
- Class: Insecta
- Order: Coleoptera
- Suborder: Polyphaga
- Infraorder: Cucujiformia
- Superfamily: Curculionoidea
- Family: Curculionidae
- Genus: Caulophilus
- Species: C. dubius

Binomial name
- Caulophilus dubius (Horn, 1873)

= Caulophilus dubius =

Species of beetle

Caulophilus dubius is a species of true weevil in the beetle family Curculionidae.
