= Mesites subcylindricus =

Scientific classification
- Kingdom: Animalia
- Phylum: Arthropoda
- Clade: Pancrustacea
- Class: Insecta
- Order: Coleoptera
- Suborder: Polyphaga
- Infraorder: Cucujiformia
- Superfamily: Curculionoidea
- Family: Curculionidae
- Genus: Mesites
- Species: M. subcylindricus

Binomial name
- Mesites subcylindricus (Horn, 1873)

Species of beetle

Mesites subcylindricus is a species of true weevil in the beetle family Curculionidae. It is found in North America.
