= Cossonus corticola =

Scientific classification
- Kingdom: Animalia
- Phylum: Arthropoda
- Clade: Pancrustacea
- Class: Insecta
- Order: Coleoptera
- Suborder: Polyphaga
- Infraorder: Cucujiformia
- Superfamily: Curculionoidea
- Family: Curculionidae
- Genus: Cossonus
- Species: C. corticola

Binomial name
- Cossonus corticola Say, 1831

Synonyms
- Borophloeus minor Wollaston, 1873; Rhyncholus latinasus Say, 1831

Species of beetle

Cossonus corticola is a species of true weevil in the beetle family Curculionidae. It is found in North America.
