= Cossonus platalea =

Scientific classification
- Kingdom: Animalia
- Phylum: Arthropoda
- Clade: Pancrustacea
- Class: Insecta
- Order: Coleoptera
- Suborder: Polyphaga
- Infraorder: Cucujiformia
- Superfamily: Curculionoidea
- Family: Curculionidae
- Genus: Cossonus
- Species: C. platalea

Binomial name
- Cossonus platalea Say, 1831

Synonyms
- Cossonus bohemanni Horn, 1873; Cossonus subareatus Boheman, 1845

Species of beetle

Cossonus platalea is a species of true weevil in the beetle family Curculionidae. It is found in North America.
