= Zygothuria =

Scientific classification
- Kingdom: Animalia
- Phylum: Echinodermata
- Class: Holothuroidea
- Order: Holothuriida
- Family: Mesothuriidae
- Genus: Zygothuria; R. Perrier, 1898

Genus of sea cucumbers

Zygothuria is a genus of sea cucumbers belonging to the family Mesothuriidae. The genus has a cosmopolitan distribution.

== Species ==
The following species are recognised in the genus Zygothuria:

- Mesothuria candelabri Hérouard, 1923
- Mesothuria connectens R. Perrier, 1898
- Mesothuria lactea Théel, 1886
- Mesothuria marginata Sluiter, 1901
- Mesothuria oxysclera R. Perrier, 1899
- Mesothuria thomsoni Théel, 1886
