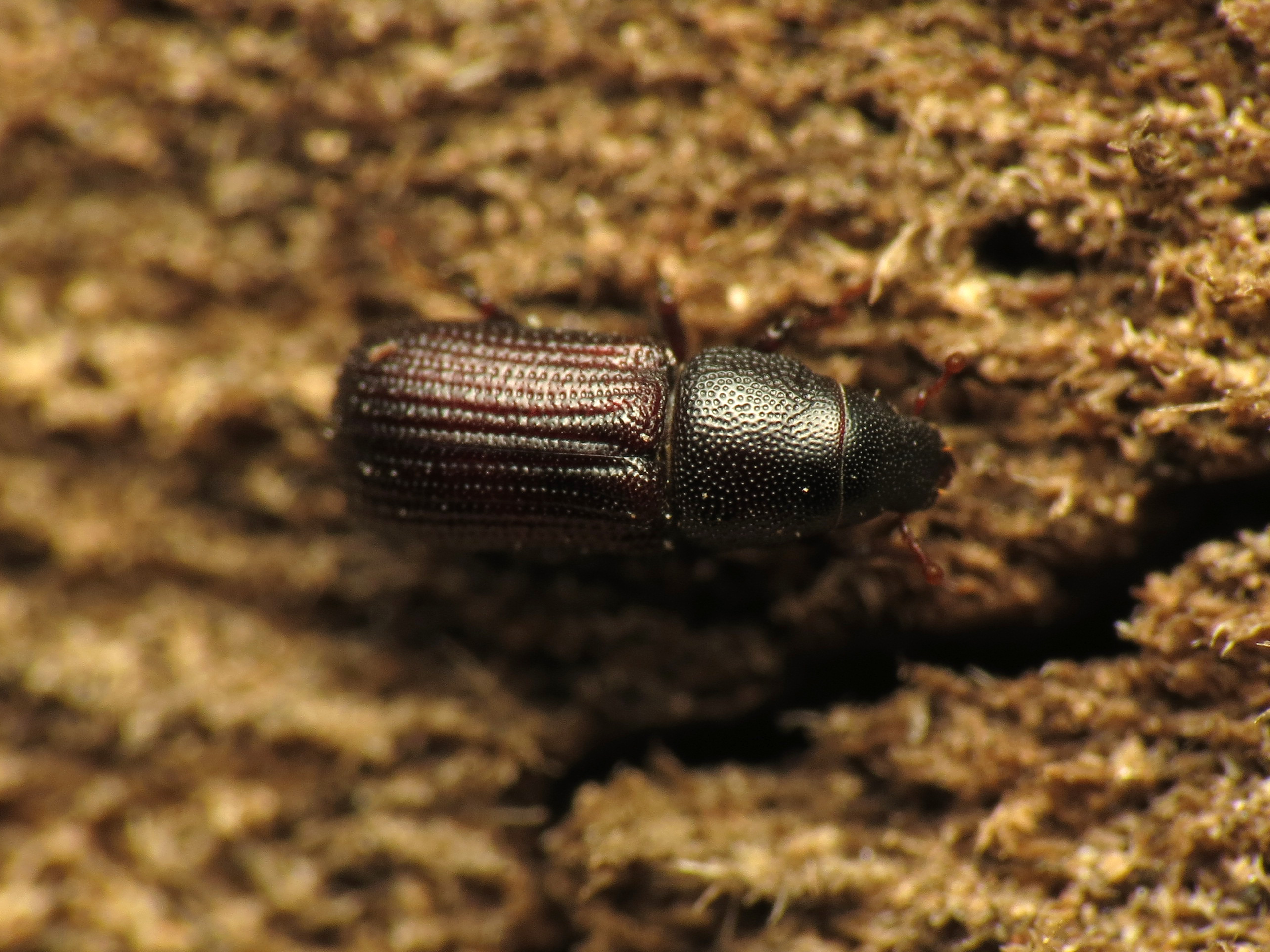

Scientific classification
- Kingdom: Animalia
- Phylum: Arthropoda
- Clade: Pancrustacea
- Class: Insecta
- Order: Coleoptera
- Suborder: Polyphaga
- Infraorder: Cucujiformia
- Superfamily: Curculionoidea
- Family: Curculionidae
- Genus: Stenoscelis
- Species: S. brevis

Binomial name
- Stenoscelis brevis (Boheman, 1845)

= Stenoscelis brevis =

Species of beetle

Stenoscelis brevis is a species of snout or bark beetle in the family Curculionidae. It is found in North America.

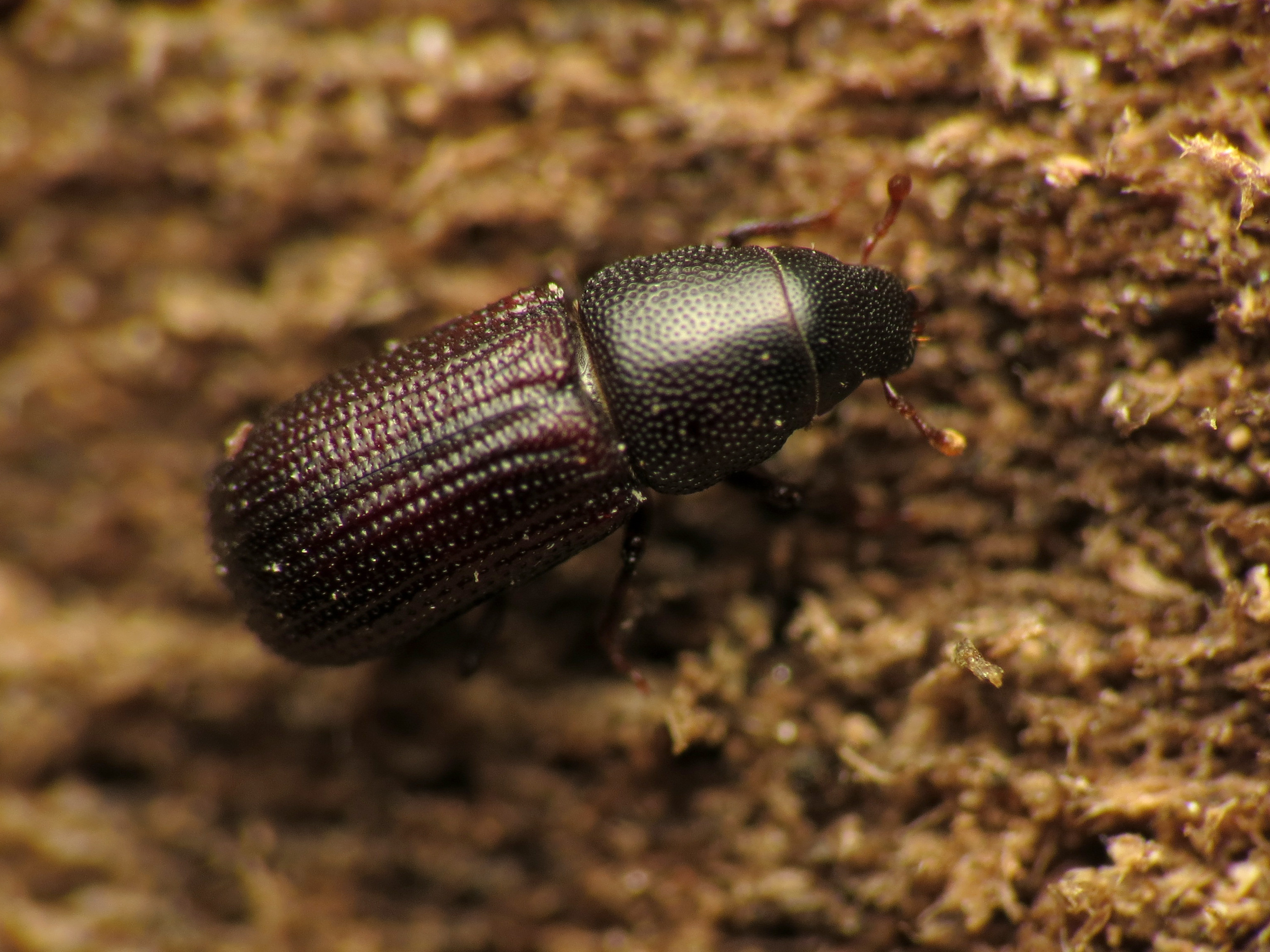
