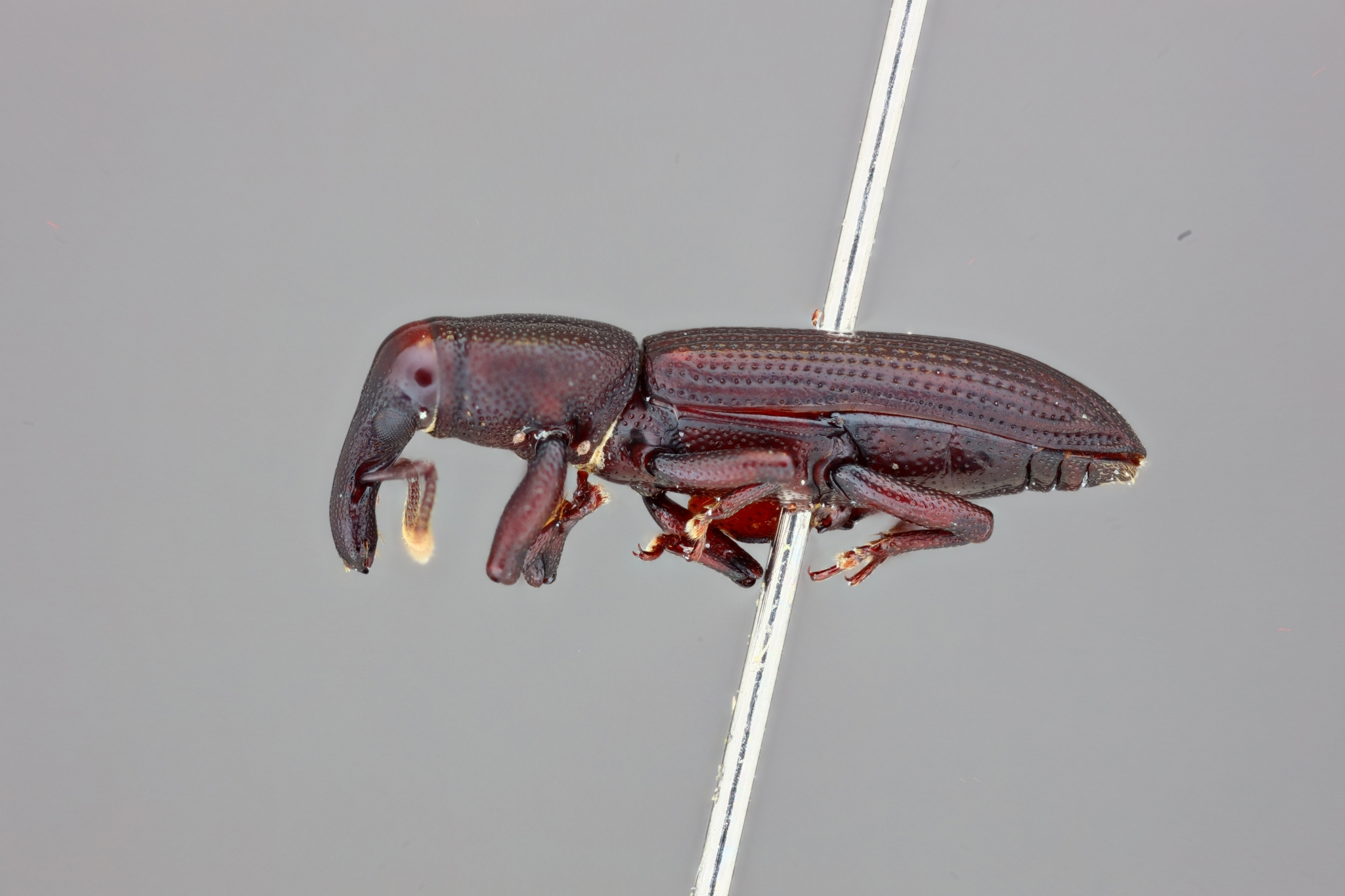
- Oxydema fusiforme, Hawaii

Scientific classification
- Kingdom: Animalia
- Phylum: Arthropoda
- Clade: Pancrustacea
- Class: Insecta
- Order: Coleoptera
- Suborder: Polyphaga
- Infraorder: Cucujiformia
- Clade: Phytophaga
- Superfamily: Curculionoidea
- Family: Curculionidae
- Genus: Oxydema
- Species: O. fusiforme

Binomial name
- Oxydema fusiforme Wollaston, 1873

= Oxydema fusiforme =

Species of beetle

Oxydema fusiforme, commonly known as citrus flower beetle, is a species of weevil widely distributed in Indo-Pacific islands such as Sri Lanka, the Seychelles, Rodriguez Island, the Marquesas Islands, the Samoan Islands, the Hawaiian Islands, Guam Island, and Marcus Island.

== Biology ==
Adult beetles are collected from a rotten log of Tournefortia argentea. The other host plants include Aleurites moluccana and Pandanus odorifer. It is also an intermediate host of the nematode Cheilospirura hamulosa.
