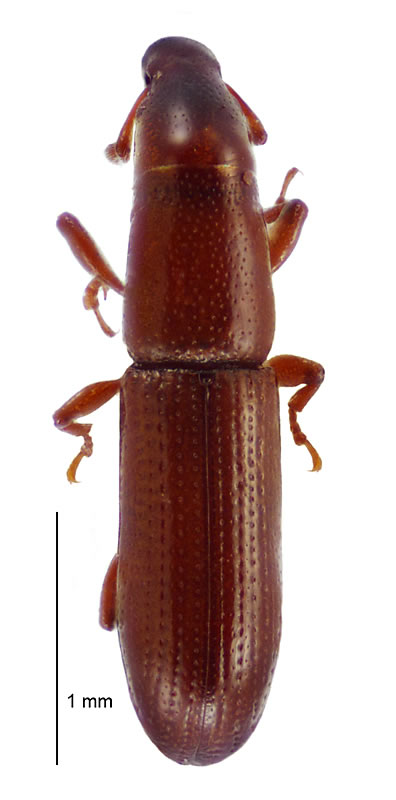

Scientific classification
- Kingdom: Animalia
- Phylum: Arthropoda
- Clade: Pancrustacea
- Class: Insecta
- Order: Coleoptera
- Suborder: Polyphaga
- Infraorder: Cucujiformia
- Superfamily: Curculionoidea
- Family: Curculionidae
- Genus: Macrorhyncolus
- Species: M. littoralis

Binomial name
- Macrorhyncolus littoralis Broun (1880)

= Macrorhyncolus littoralis =

Species of beetle

Macrorhyncolus littoralis, the driftwood weevil, is a species of true weevil in the family of beetles known as Curculionidae.

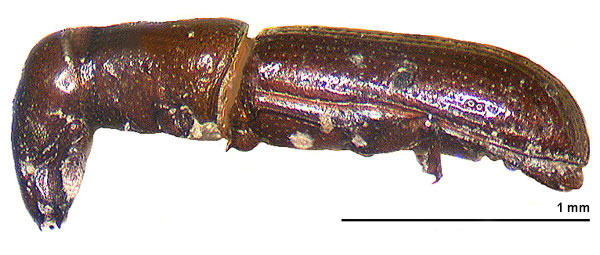
Driftwood weevil, Macrorhyncolus littoralis
