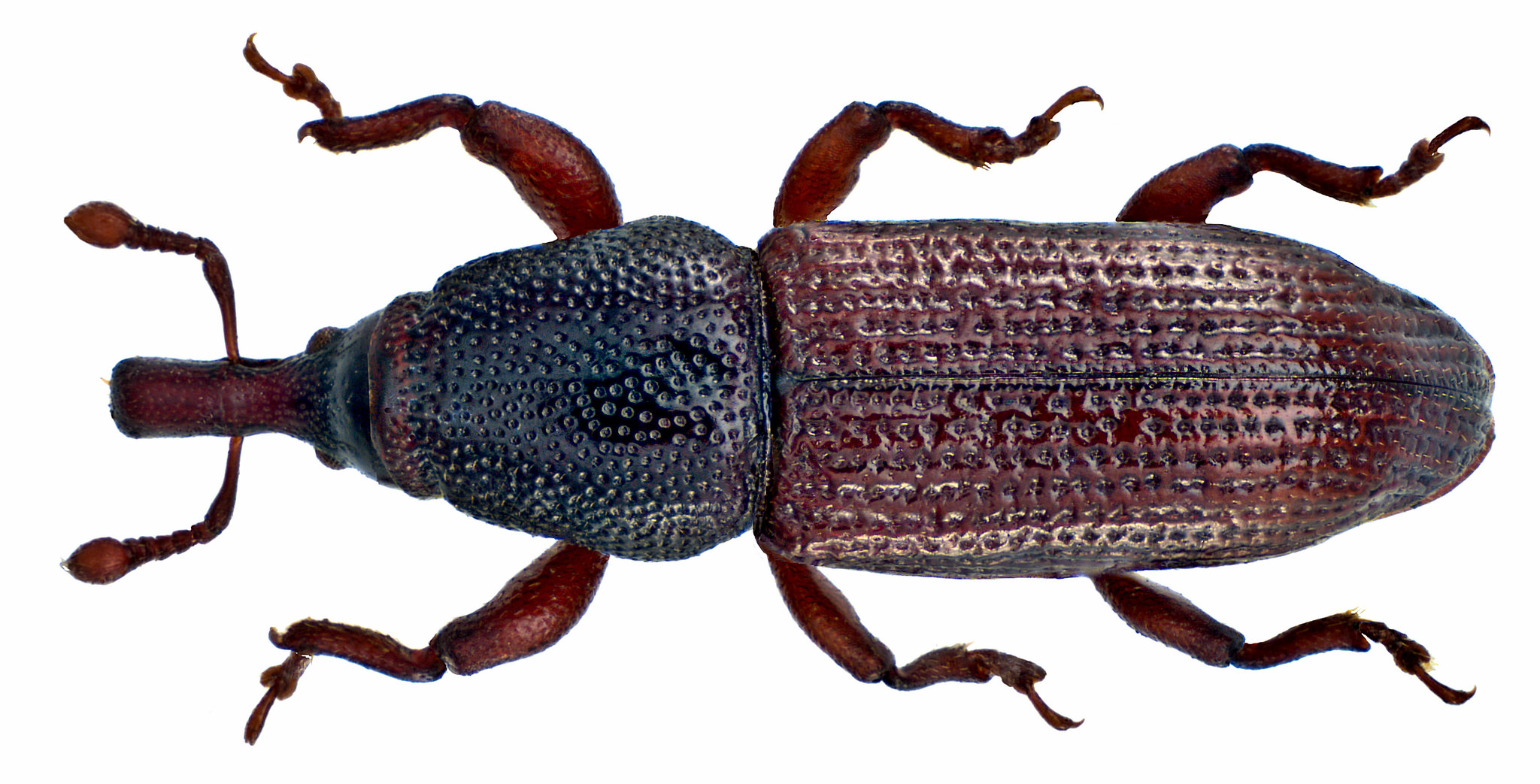
- Pentarthrum huttoni

Scientific classification
- Kingdom: Animalia
- Phylum: Arthropoda
- Clade: Pancrustacea
- Class: Insecta
- Order: Coleoptera
- Suborder: Polyphaga
- Infraorder: Cucujiformia
- Superfamily: Curculionoidea
- Family: Curculionidae
- Subfamily: Cossoninae
- Tribe: Pentarthrini
- Genus: Pentarthrum; Wollaston, 1854

Synonyms
- Pentarthron Marseul, 1888

= Pentarthrum =

Genus of beetles

Pentarthrum is a genus of beetle in family Curculionidae. It contains about 70 species of mainly tropical distribution.

== Partial list of species ==
- Pentarthrum angustissimum Wollaston, 1873
- †Pentarthrum blackburni Sharp, 1878
- Pentarthrum halodorum Perkins, 1926
- Pentarthrum huttoni Wollaston, 1854
- Pentarthrum obscurum Sharp, 1878
