= Allopentarthrum =

Scientific classification
- Kingdom: Animalia
- Phylum: Arthropoda
- Clade: Pancrustacea
- Class: Insecta
- Order: Coleoptera
- Suborder: Polyphaga
- Infraorder: Cucujiformia
- Superfamily: Curculionoidea
- Family: Curculionidae
- Tribe: Dryotribini
- Genus: Allopentarthrum; Kuschel in Wibmer & O'Brien, 1986

Species
- A. elumbe

Genus of beetles

Allopentarthrum is a genus of true weevil. It contains the following species:

- Allopentarthrum elumbe (Boheman, 1838)
