= Cossonus impressifrons =

Scientific classification
- Kingdom: Animalia
- Phylum: Arthropoda
- Clade: Pancrustacea
- Class: Insecta
- Order: Coleoptera
- Suborder: Polyphaga
- Infraorder: Cucujiformia
- Superfamily: Curculionoidea
- Family: Curculionidae
- Genus: Cossonus
- Species: C. impressifrons

Binomial name
- Cossonus impressifrons Boheman, 1838

Synonyms
- Cossonus concinnus Boheman, 1838

Species of beetle

Cossonus impressifrons is a species of true weevil in the beetle family Curculionidae.
