= Allopentarthrum elumbe =

Conservation status
- Least Concern (IUCN 3.1)

Scientific classification
- Kingdom: Animalia
- Phylum: Arthropoda
- Clade: Pancrustacea
- Class: Insecta
- Order: Coleoptera
- Suborder: Polyphaga
- Infraorder: Cucujiformia
- Superfamily: Curculionoidea
- Family: Curculionidae
- Genus: Allopentarthrum
- Species: A. elumbe

Binomial name
- Allopentarthrum elumbe (Boheman, 1838)

Synonyms
- Pentarthrum blackburni Sharp, 1878; Rhyncolus elumbis Boheman, 1838

Species of beetle

Allopentarthrum elumbe is a widespread species of true weevil that is found from Hawaiʻi, Colombia, French Guiana, the Galápagos Islands, the West Indies, Ascension Island, Africa, Madagascar, Malaysia, Japan, Papua New Guinea, Lord Howe Island and Samoa. It inhabits tropical forest habitats across its range.
