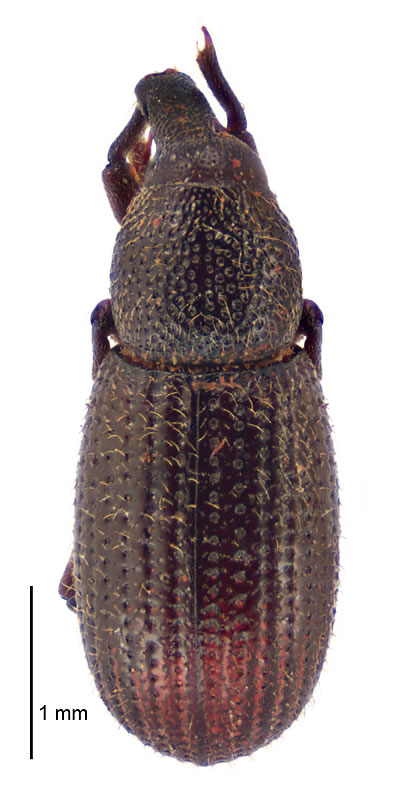

Scientific classification
- Kingdom: Animalia
- Phylum: Arthropoda
- Class: Insecta
- Order: Coleoptera
- Suborder: Polyphaga
- Infraorder: Cucujiformia
- Family: Curculionidae
- Genus: Pselactus
- Species: P. spadix

Binomial name
- Pselactus spadix (Herbst, 1795)

= Pselactus spadix =

Species of beetle

Pselactus spadix is a species of weevil native to Europe.
