= Hexarthrum ulkei =

Scientific classification
- Kingdom: Animalia
- Phylum: Arthropoda
- Clade: Pancrustacea
- Class: Insecta
- Order: Coleoptera
- Suborder: Polyphaga
- Infraorder: Cucujiformia
- Superfamily: Curculionoidea
- Family: Curculionidae
- Genus: Hexarthrum
- Species: H. ulkei

Binomial name
- Hexarthrum ulkei Horn, 1873

Species of beetle

Hexarthrum ulkei, the eastern wood weevil, is a species of true weevil in the beetle family Curculionidae. It is found in North America.
