= Trichacorynus protractus =

Scientific classification
- Kingdom: Animalia
- Phylum: Arthropoda
- Clade: Pancrustacea
- Class: Insecta
- Order: Coleoptera
- Suborder: Polyphaga
- Infraorder: Cucujiformia
- Superfamily: Curculionoidea
- Family: Curculionidae
- Genus: Trichacorynus
- Species: T. protractus

Binomial name
- Trichacorynus protractus (Horn, 1873)

Synonyms
- Trichacorynus sulcirostris Blatchley, 1928

Species of beetle

Trichacorynus protractus is a species of true weevil in the beetle family Curculionidae. It is found in North America.
