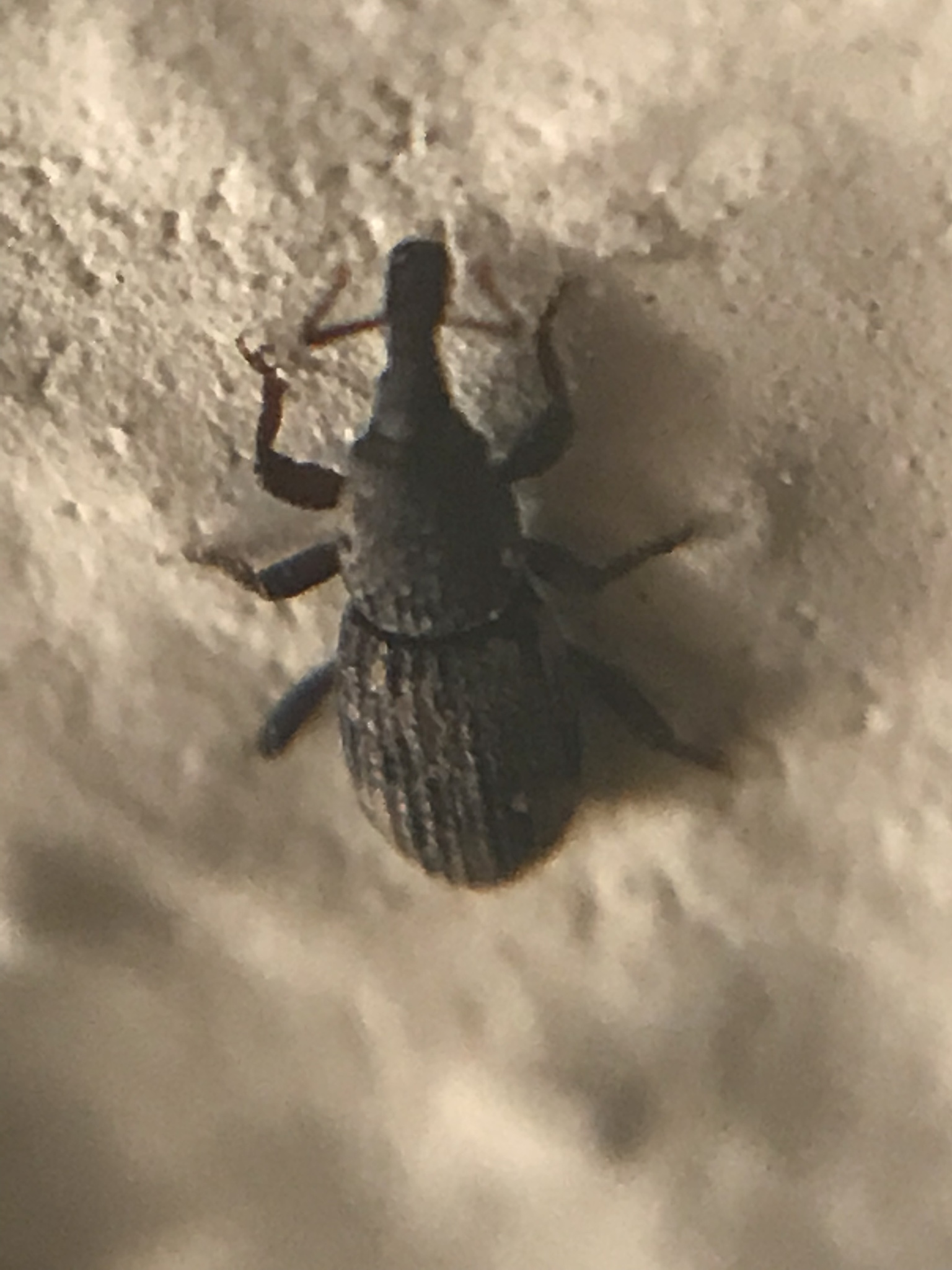

Conservation status
- Least Concern (IUCN 3.1)

Scientific classification
- Kingdom: Animalia
- Phylum: Arthropoda
- Clade: Pancrustacea
- Class: Insecta
- Order: Coleoptera
- Suborder: Polyphaga
- Infraorder: Cucujiformia
- Superfamily: Curculionoidea
- Family: Curculionidae
- Genus: Dryotribus
- Species: D. mimeticus

Binomial name
- Dryotribus mimeticus Horn, 1873

= Dryotribus mimeticus =

Species of beetle

Dryotribus mimeticus is a species of beetle in the family Curculionidae. It is endemic to the United States, with the species also being recorded on Scorpion Reef a remote island chain in Mexico. The species also occurred in Florida, it has been suggested in Biologia Centrali-Americana that it was actually introduced to Hawaii from the Florida population. The species was said to have occurred in drift logs on Laysan Island, French Frigate Shoals, Johnston Island and Wake Island. Despite being considered extinct since 1986, 2 specimen of D. mimeticus were found and collected in the Dominican Republic in 1997; 11 years after the species was said to be extinct. In 2002 another specimen of the species was collected in Montserrat.
