= Pentarthrum blackburni =

Conservation status
- Extinct (yes) (IUCN 2.3)

Scientific classification
- Kingdom: Animalia
- Phylum: Arthropoda
- Clade: Pancrustacea
- Class: Insecta
- Order: Coleoptera
- Suborder: Polyphaga
- Infraorder: Cucujiformia
- Superfamily: Curculionoidea
- Family: Curculionidae
- Genus: Pentarthrum
- Species: †P. blackburni

Binomial name
- †Pentarthrum blackburni Sharp, 1878

Extonct species of beetle

Pentarthrum blackburni was a species of beetle in family Curculionidae. It was endemic to Hawaii.
