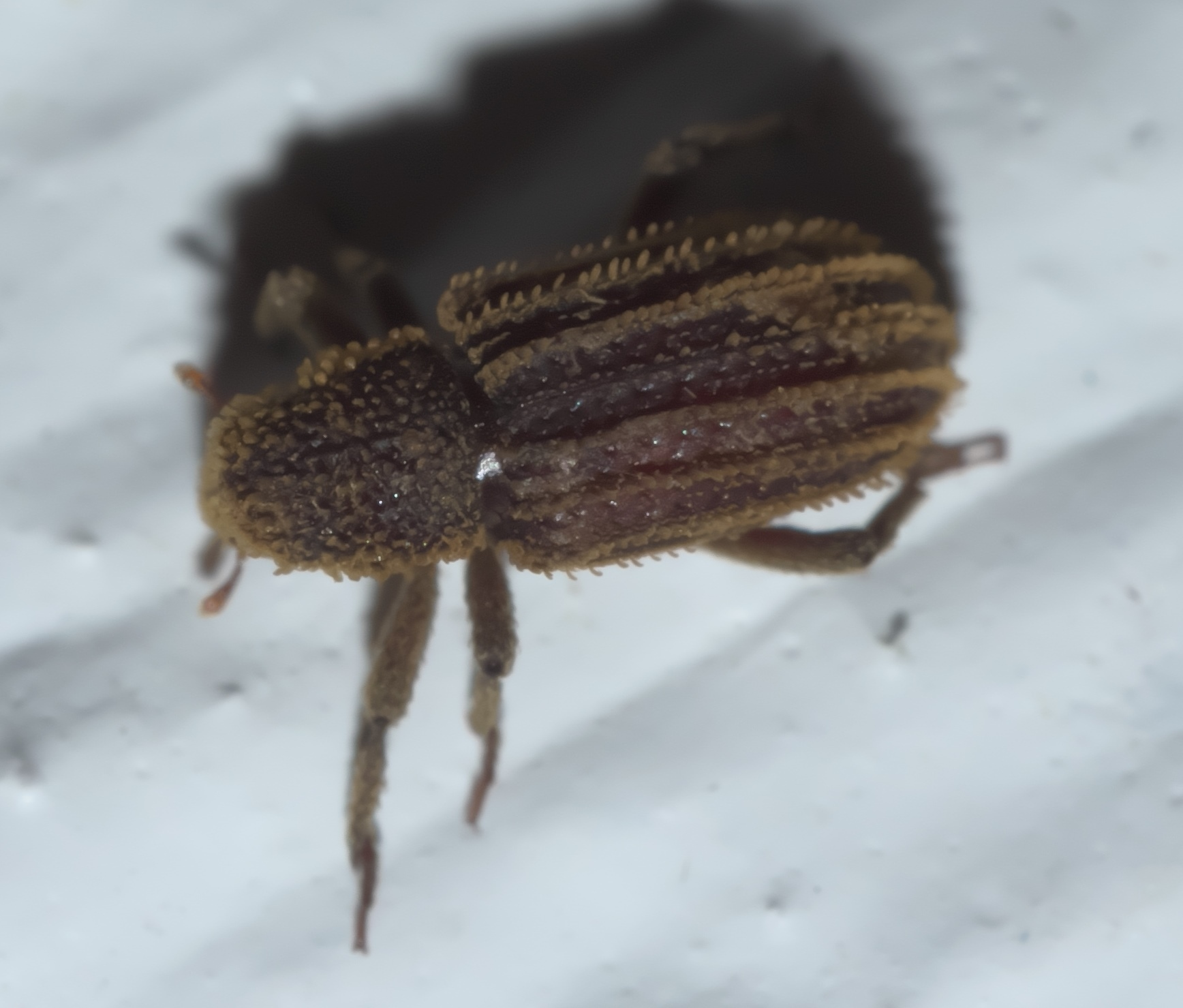
- Acamptus echinus, Oklahoma

Scientific classification
- Kingdom: Animalia
- Phylum: Arthropoda
- Clade: Pancrustacea
- Class: Insecta
- Order: Coleoptera
- Suborder: Polyphaga
- Infraorder: Cucujiformia
- Superfamily: Curculionoidea
- Family: Curculionidae
- Genus: Acamptus
- Species: A. echinus

Binomial name
- Acamptus echinus Casey, 1892

= Acamptus echinus =

Species of weevil beetle

Acamptus echinus is a species of true weevil in the family of beetles known as Curculionidae. It is found in North America.
