= Acamptus =

Scientific classification
- Kingdom: Animalia
- Phylum: Arthropoda
- Clade: Pancrustacea
- Class: Insecta
- Order: Coleoptera
- Suborder: Polyphaga
- Infraorder: Cucujiformia
- Superfamily: Curculionoidea
- Family: Curculionidae
- Subfamily: Cossoninae
- Genus: Acamptus; LeConte, 1876

Genus of beetles

Acamptus is a genus of true weevils in the beetle family Curculionidae. There are about nine described species in Acamptus.

== Species ==
These nine species belong to the genus Acamptus:

- Acamptus cancellatus Zimmerman, 1974
- Acamptus echinus Casey, 1892
- Acamptus exilipes Poinar & Legalov, 2015
- Acamptus interstitialis Hustache, 1936
- Acamptus orthodoxus Hustache, 1932
- Acamptus plurisetosus Zimmerman, 1974
- Acamptus rigidus LeConte, 1876
- Acamptus texanus (Sleeper, 1954)
- Acamptus verrucosus Voss, 1947
