= Cossonus rufipennis =

Scientific classification
- Kingdom: Animalia
- Phylum: Arthropoda
- Clade: Pancrustacea
- Class: Insecta
- Order: Coleoptera
- Suborder: Polyphaga
- Infraorder: Cucujiformia
- Superfamily: Curculionoidea
- Family: Curculionidae
- Genus: Cossonus
- Species: C. rufipennis

Binomial name
- Cossonus rufipennis Buchanan, 1936

Species of beetle

Cossonus rufipennis is a species of true weevil in the beetle family Curculionidae.
