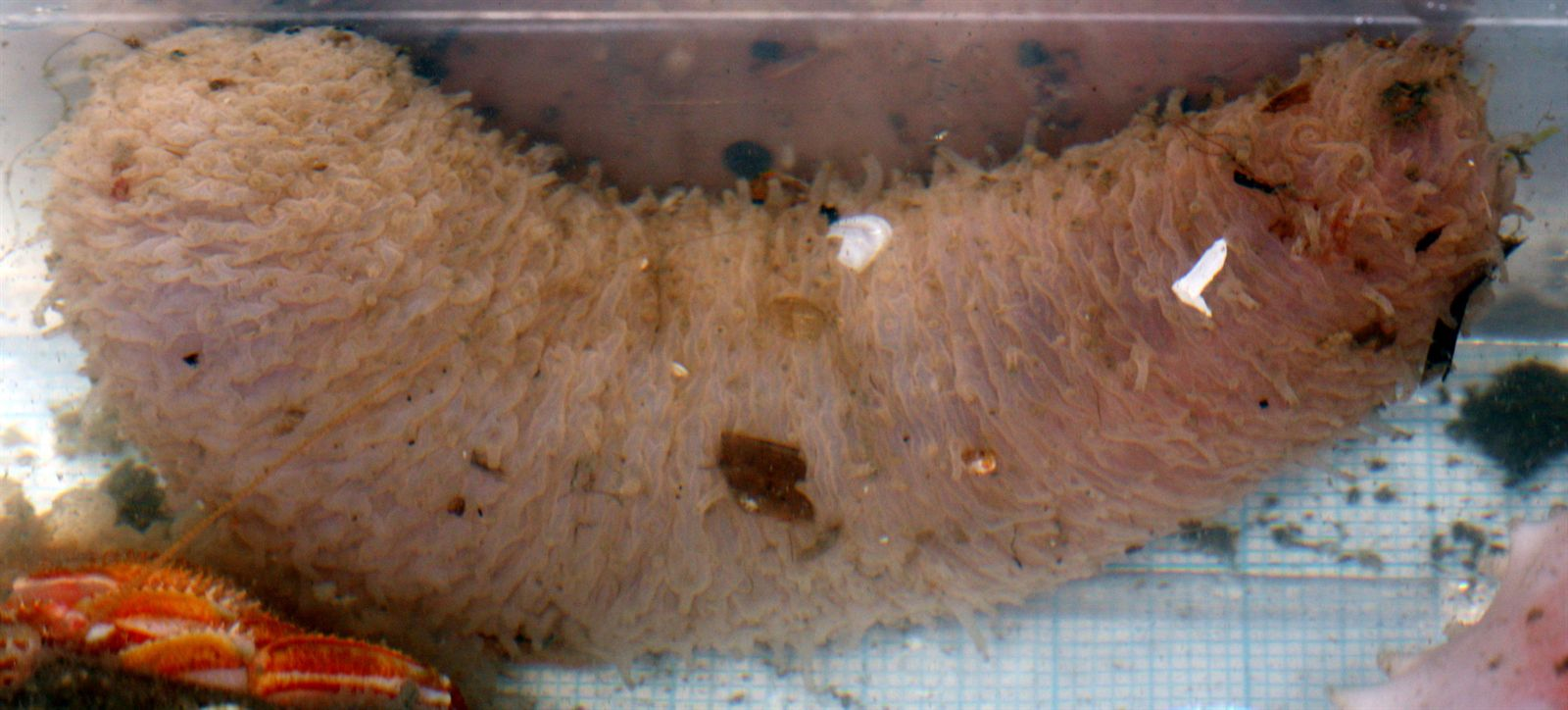
- Mesothuria intestinalis

Scientific classification
- Domain: Eukaryota
- Kingdom: Animalia
- Phylum: Echinodermata
- Class: Holothuroidea
- Order: Holothuriida
- Family: Mesothuriidae; Smirnov, 2012

= Mesothuriidae =

Family of echinoderms

Mesothuriidae is a family of echinoderms belonging to the order Holothuriida.

== Genera ==
There are two genera recognised in the family Mesothuriidae:

- Mesothuria Ludwig, 1894 - 26 species
- Zygothuria Perrier, 1898 - 6 species
