= Caulophilus oryzae =

Scientific classification
- Kingdom: Animalia
- Phylum: Arthropoda
- Clade: Pancrustacea
- Class: Insecta
- Order: Coleoptera
- Suborder: Polyphaga
- Infraorder: Cucujiformia
- Superfamily: Curculionoidea
- Family: Curculionidae
- Genus: Caulophilus
- Species: C. oryzae

Binomial name
- Caulophilus oryzae (Gyllenhal, 1838)

Synonyms
- Caulophilus sculpturatus Wollaston, 1854; Cossonus pinguis Horn, 1873; Rhyncolus lauri Gyllenhal, 1838

Species of beetle

Caulophilus oryzae, the broad-nosed grain weevil, is a species of true weevil in the beetle family Curculionidae.
