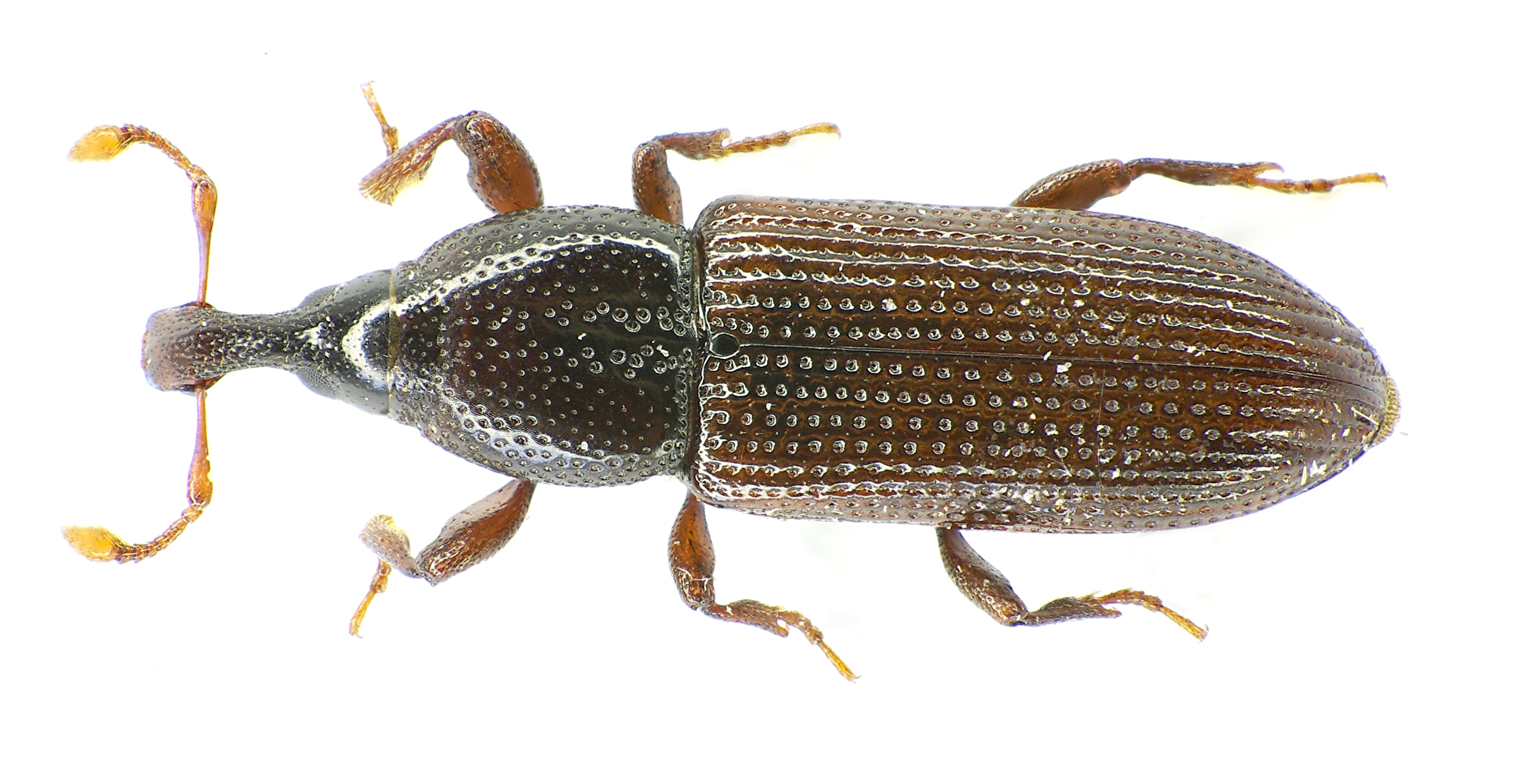
- Cossonus linearis

Scientific classification
- Kingdom: Animalia
- Phylum: Arthropoda
- Clade: Pancrustacea
- Class: Insecta
- Order: Coleoptera
- Suborder: Polyphaga
- Infraorder: Cucujiformia
- Superfamily: Curculionoidea
- Family: Curculionidae
- Subfamily: Cossoninae
- Tribe: Cossonini; Schoenherr, 1825

Genera
- See text

= Cossonini =

Tribe of beetles

Cossonini is a weevil tribe in the subfamily Cossoninae.

== Genera ==
Afrocossonus - Brachychaenus - Coprodema - Cossonus - Deinocossonus - Dynatopechas - Exodema - Exomesites - Exonotus - Gloeodema - Gloeotrogus - Gloeoxenus - Hemigleodema - Heteramphus - Heterophaseolus - Homalotrogus - Hoplocossonus - Kojimazo - Lasiotrupis - Leurostenus - Lissopsis - Macrocordylus - Marvaldiella - Megalocorynus - Melarhinus - Mesites - Mesitinus - Mesostenotrupis - Microhimatium - Micromesites - Oxydema - Pachytrogus - Pentamimus - Phloeophagoides - Pholidoforus - Procossonus - Pseadomesites - Pseudocossonus - Psilotrogus - Rhopalomesites - Rhyncolosoma - Rhypax - Seenomma - Sphaerocorynes - Stenotrupis - Stereoborus - Stereomimetes - Stereonotus - Stereotribus - Syncoxus - Tetracoptus - Tetragonorrhamphus - Vauriellina - Xestoderma
