= Pselactus =

Scientific classification
- Kingdom: Animalia
- Phylum: Arthropoda
- Class: Insecta
- Order: Coleoptera
- Suborder: Polyphaga
- Infraorder: Cucujiformia
- Family: Curculionidae
- Subfamily: Cossoninae
- Genus: Pselactus; Broun, 1886

Genus of beetles

Pselactus is a genus of beetles belonging to the family Curculionidae.

The species of this genus are found in Europe, Northwestern Africa and Northern America.

Selected species:

- Pselactus affinis (Wollaston, 1861)
- Pselactus apionoides Horn, 1873
- Pselactus spadix (J.F.W.Herbst, 1795)
