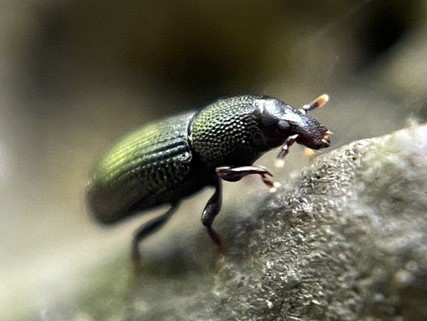

Scientific classification
- Kingdom: Animalia
- Phylum: Arthropoda
- Clade: Pancrustacea
- Class: Insecta
- Order: Coleoptera
- Suborder: Polyphaga
- Infraorder: Cucujiformia
- Superfamily: Curculionoidea
- Family: Curculionidae
- Genus: Pseudopentarthrum
- Species: P. simplex

Binomial name
- Pseudopentarthrum simplex Casey, 1892

= Pseudopentarthrum simplex =

Species of beetle

Pseudopentarthrum simplex is a species of true weevil in the beetle family Curculionidae. It is found in North America.
