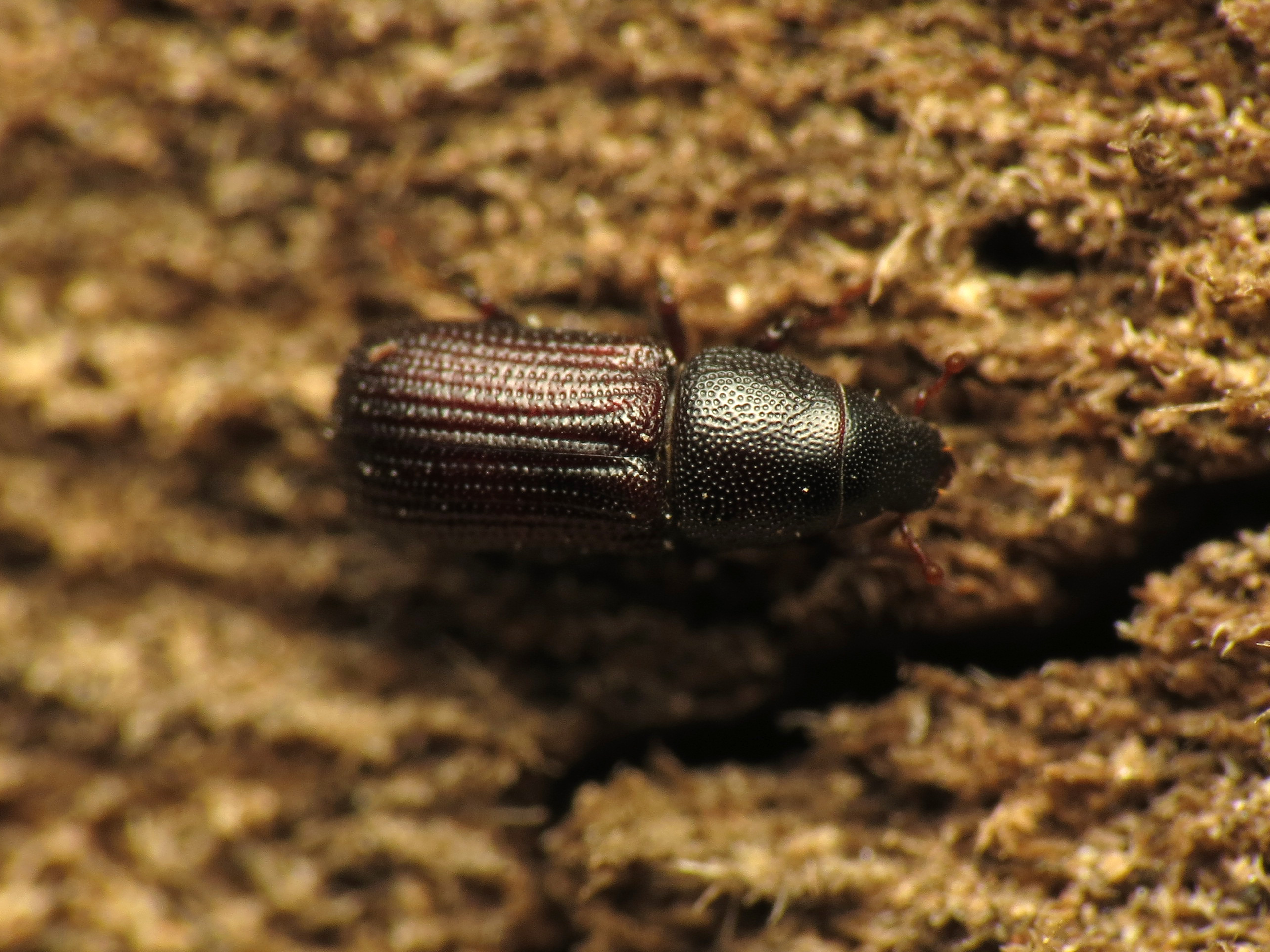
- Stenoscelis brevis

Scientific classification
- Kingdom: Animalia
- Phylum: Arthropoda
- Clade: Pancrustacea
- Class: Insecta
- Order: Coleoptera
- Suborder: Polyphaga
- Infraorder: Cucujiformia
- Superfamily: Curculionoidea
- Family: Curculionidae
- Genus: Stenoscelis; Wollaston, 1861

= Stenoscelis =

Genus of beetles

Stenoscelis is a genus of snout and bark beetles in the family Curculionidae. There are at least 30 described species in Stenoscelis.

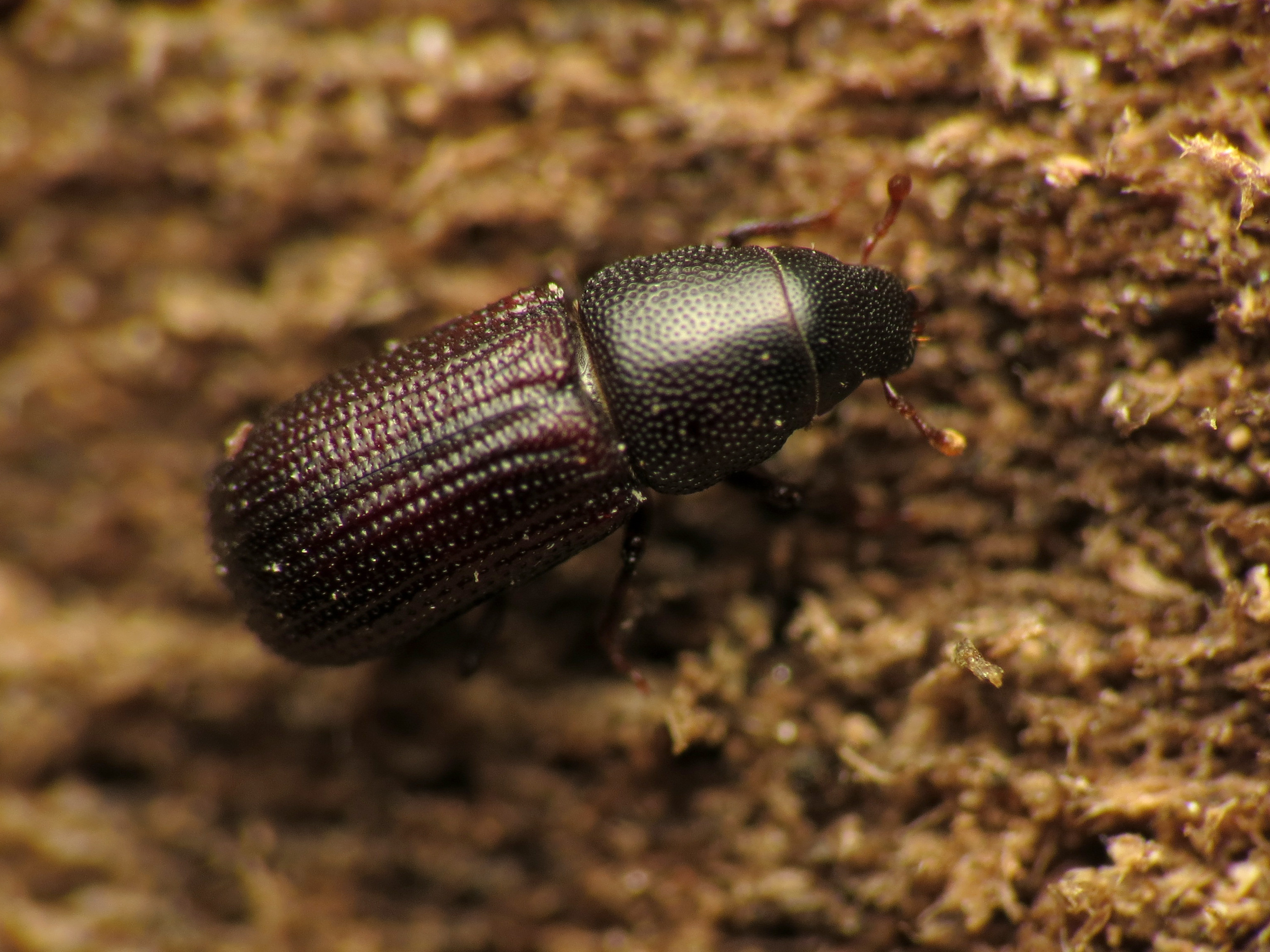
Stenoscelis brevis

== Species ==
These 35 species belong to the genus Stenoscelis:

- Stenoscelis acerbus Zhang, 1995
- Stenoscelis aceri Konishi, 1962
- Stenoscelis acutipennis Zherikhin in Zherikhin & Egorov, 1990
- Stenoscelis africanus Eggers, 1922
- Stenoscelis alni Zhang, 1995
- Stenoscelis andersoni Buchanan, 1948
- Stenoscelis badius Marshall, 1957
- Stenoscelis binodifer Marshall, 1940
- Stenoscelis brevis (Boheman, 1845)
- Stenoscelis clavatus Hustache, 1956
- Stenoscelis crassifrons Wollaston, 1873
- Stenoscelis cryptomeriae Konishi, 1962
- Stenoscelis dentibasis Voss, 1974
- Stenoscelis foveatus Zhang, 1995
- Stenoscelis gracilitarsis Wollaston, 1873
- Stenoscelis himalayensis Stebbing, 1914
- Stenoscelis hylastoides Wollaston, 1861
- Stenoscelis lefevrei Marshall, 1953
- Stenoscelis leviceps Marshall, 1953
- Stenoscelis longifolia Stebbing, 1914
- Stenoscelis longisetosus Konishi, 1956
- Stenoscelis marginicauda Marshall, 1953
- Stenoscelis parcus Voss, 1964
- Stenoscelis pittospori Marshall, 1956
- Stenoscelis podocarpi Marshall, 1956
- Stenoscelis puncticulatus Zhang, 1995
- Stenoscelis recavus Zhang, 1995
- Stenoscelis schedli Voss, 1964
- Stenoscelis scutellatus Hustache, 1936
- Stenoscelis sellatocollis Marshall, 1937
- Stenoscelis semiopacus Voss, 1962
- Stenoscelis setosus Marshall, 1937
- Stenoscelis strigicollis Marshall, 1937
- Stenoscelis widdringtoniae Marshall, 1956
- Stenoscelis yuxianensis Zhang, 1995
