= Caulophilus =

Scientific classification
- Kingdom: Animalia
- Phylum: Arthropoda
- Clade: Pancrustacea
- Class: Insecta
- Order: Coleoptera
- Suborder: Polyphaga
- Infraorder: Cucujiformia
- Superfamily: Curculionoidea
- Family: Curculionidae
- Tribe: Dryotribini
- Genus: Caulophilus; Wollaston, 1854

Genus of beetles

Caulophilus is a genus of true weevils in the beetle family Curculionidae. There are more than 20 described species in Caulophilus.

== Species ==
These 21 species belong to the genus Caulophilus:

- Caulophilus ashei Davis & Engel, 2006
- Caulophilus ayotzinapa Barrios-Izás, 2016
- Caulophilus bennetti Davis & Engel, 2007
- Caulophilus camptus Poinar & Legalov, 2015
- Caulophilus costatus Champion & G.C., 1909
- Caulophilus dirutus Kuschel, 1962
- Caulophilus dubius (Horn, 1873)
- Caulophilus elongatus Poinar & Legalov, 2015
- Caulophilus falini Davis & Engel, 2007
- Caulophilus latinasus Blatchley, W.S., Leng & C.W., 1916
- Caulophilus nigrirostris Aurivillius, 1931
- Caulophilus oryzae (Gyllenhal, 1838) (broad-nosed grain weevil)
- Caulophilus pinguis Horn & G.H., 1873
- Caulophilus rarus Legalov, 2016
- Caulophilus ruidipunctus Poinar & Legalov, 2015
- Caulophilus sculpturatus Wollaston & T.V., 1854
- Caulophilus sericatus Champion & G.C., 1909
- Caulophilus squamosus Legalov, 2016
- Caulophilus swensoni Davis & Engel, 2007
- Caulophilus veraecrucis Champion & G.C., 1909
- Caulophilus zherikhini Nazarenko, Legalov & Perkovsky, 2011
