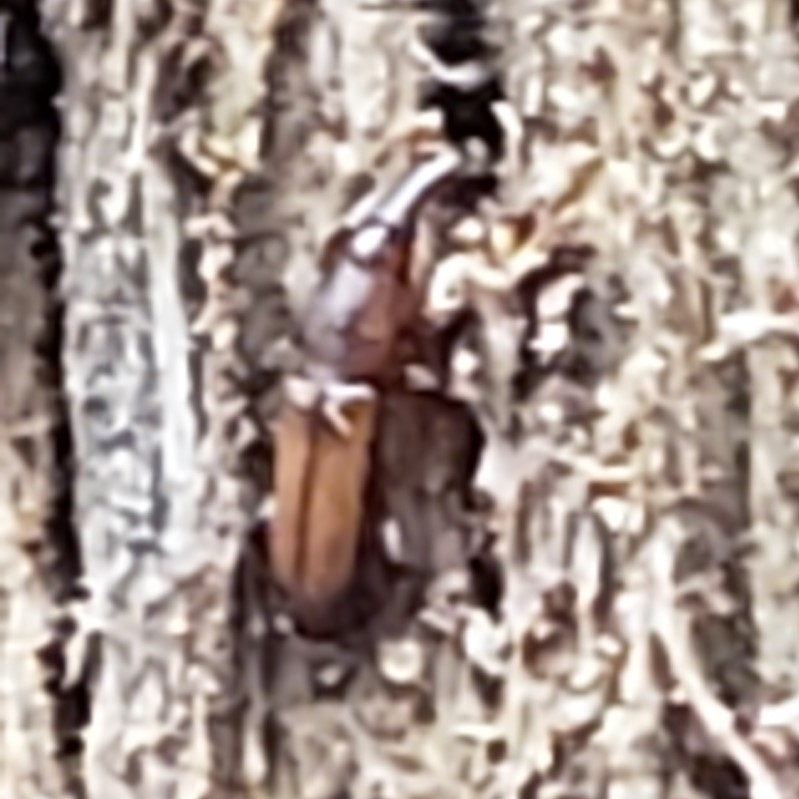
- Stenomimus pallidus

Scientific classification
- Kingdom: Animalia
- Phylum: Arthropoda
- Clade: Pancrustacea
- Class: Insecta
- Order: Coleoptera
- Suborder: Polyphaga
- Infraorder: Cucujiformia
- Superfamily: Curculionoidea
- Family: Curculionidae
- Tribe: Dryotribini
- Genus: Stenomimus; Wollaston, 1873

= Stenomimus =

Genus of beetles

Stenomimus is a genus of true weevils in the beetle family Curculionidae. There are more than 30 described species in the genus Stenomimus.

== Species ==
These 34 species belong to the genus Stenomimus:

- Stenomimus angustatus Hustache, 1932
- Stenomimus armatus Champion & G.C., 1909
- Stenomimus atomus Hustache, 1932
- Stenomimus constricticollis Champion & G.C., 1914
- Stenomimus cordillerae Voss, 1954
- Stenomimus corticalis Blatchley, W.S., Leng & C.W., 1916
- Stenomimus dirutus Champion & G.C., 1909
- Stenomimus dubius Blatchley, W.S., Leng & C.W., 1916
- Stenomimus dufaui Hustache, 1932
- Stenomimus filiformis Hustache, 1932
- Stenomimus filirostris Champion & G.C., 1909
- Stenomimus fryi Wollaston & T.V., 1873
- Stenomimus guatemalensis Champion & G.C., 1909
- Stenomimus latirostris Hustache, 1932
- Stenomimus nitidus Csiki & E., 1936
- Stenomimus orientalis Champion, 1914
- Stenomimus ovaticollis Champion & G.C., 1909
- Stenomimus ovatulus Kuschel, 1959
- Stenomimus pallidus (Boheman, 1845)
- Stenomimus persimilis Hustache, 1932
- Stenomimus politus Casey & T.L., 1892
- Stenomimus pumilus Hustache, 1932
- Stenomimus quichensis Champion & G.C., 1909
- Stenomimus rhyncoloides Champion & G.C., 1909
- Stenomimus rufipes Champion & G.C., 1909
- Stenomimus rugirostris Champion & G.C., 1909
- Stenomimus serenus Csiki & E., 1936
- Stenomimus striatus Hustache, 1932
- Stenomimus sublaevipennis Hustache, 1932
- Stenomimus suturalis Hustache, 1932
- Stenomimus venezolanus Kuschel, 1959
- Stenomimus veraepacis Champion & G.C., 1909
- Stenomimus vicinus Hustache, 1932
- Stenomimus wollastoni Champion & G.C., 1909
