= Pseudopentarthrum =

Scientific classification
- Kingdom: Animalia
- Phylum: Arthropoda
- Clade: Pancrustacea
- Class: Insecta
- Order: Coleoptera
- Suborder: Polyphaga
- Infraorder: Cucujiformia
- Superfamily: Curculionoidea
- Family: Curculionidae
- Tribe: Onycholipini
- Genus: Pseudopentarthrum; Wollaston, 1873

Genus of beetles

Pseudopentarthrum is a genus of true weevils in the beetle family Curculionidae. There are about 18 described species in Pseudopentarthrum.

== Species ==
These 18 species belong to the genus Pseudopentarthrum:

- Pseudopentarthrum angustulum Champion & G.C., 1909
- Pseudopentarthrum brevirostre Champion & G.C., 1909
- Pseudopentarthrum caudatum Champion, 1910
- Pseudopentarthrum ferruginipes Hustache, 1932
- Pseudopentarthrum fraternum Blatchley, 1928
- Pseudopentarthrum importatum Hustache & A., 1932
- Pseudopentarthrum importatus Hustache, 1932
- Pseudopentarthrum intermedium Hustache, A., 1932
- Pseudopentarthrum intermedius Hustache, 1932
- Pseudopentarthrum lineifrons Champion & G.C., 1909
- Pseudopentarthrum mexicanum Champion & G.C., 1909
- Pseudopentarthrum parvicollis (Casey, 1892)
- Pseudopentarthrum phloeophagoides Wollaston & T.V., 1873
- Pseudopentarthrum planifrons Champion & G.C., 1909
- Pseudopentarthrum robustum Casey, 1892
- Pseudopentarthrum rubustum Casey
- Pseudopentarthrum simplex Casey, 1892
- Pseudopentarthrum stenoderes Kuschel, 1959
