= Nyssonotus =

Scientific classification
- Kingdom: Animalia
- Phylum: Arthropoda
- Clade: Pancrustacea
- Class: Insecta
- Order: Coleoptera
- Suborder: Polyphaga
- Infraorder: Cucujiformia
- Superfamily: Curculionoidea
- Family: Curculionidae
- Tribe: Rhyncolini
- Genus: Nyssonotus; Casey, 1892

Genus of beetles

Nyssonotus is a genus of true weevils in the beetle family Curculionidae. There are at least two described species in Nyssonotus.

== Species ==
These two species belong to the genus Nyssonotus:

- Nyssonotus angustus Hustache, 1932
- Nyssonotus seriatus Casey, 1892
