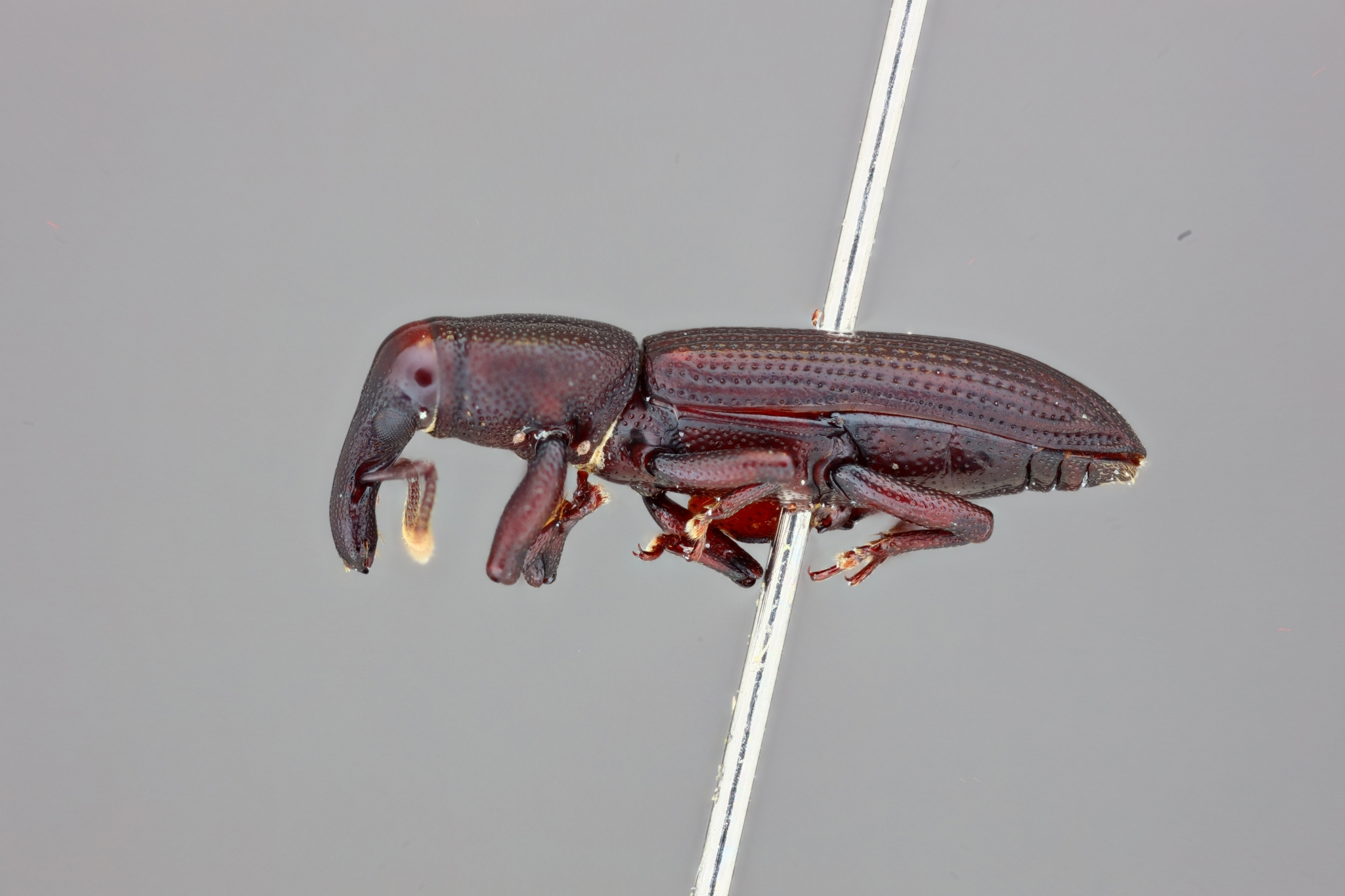
- Oxydema fusiforme, Hawaii

Scientific classification
- Kingdom: Animalia
- Phylum: Arthropoda
- Class: Insecta
- Order: Coleoptera
- Suborder: Polyphaga
- Infraorder: Cucujiformia
- Family: Curculionidae
- Genus: Oxydema; T.V.Wollaston, 1873

= Oxydema =

Genus of beetles

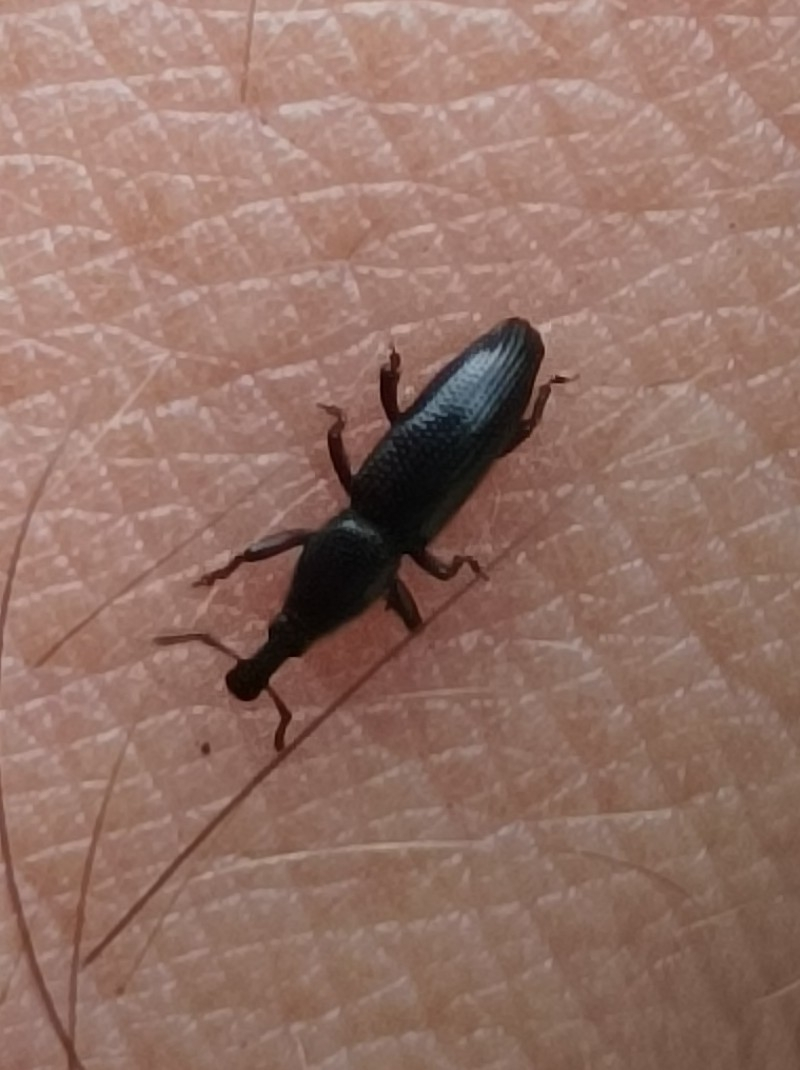
Oxydema longula, Vanuatu

Oxydema is a genus of weevils in the beetle family Curculionidae. There are about 19 described species in Oxydema.

== Species ==
These 19 species belong to the genus Oxydema:

- Oxydema aksentjevi Zherikhin in Zherikhin & Egorov, 1990
- Oxydema attenuatum Wollaston, T.V., 1873
- Oxydema barbata Voss, 1951
- Oxydema disjunctus Voss, 1957
- Oxydema elongatum Pascoe, F.P., 1885
- Oxydema fusiforme Wollaston, T.V., 1873
- Oxydema fusiformis Wollaston, 1873
- Oxydema hospes Csiki, E., 1936
- Oxydema longulum Zimmerman, 1940
- Oxydema luzonicus Zimmerman, 1956
- Oxydema naso Pascoe, F.P., 1885
- Oxydema nicolaiae Voss, 1951
- Oxydema orchidarum Marshall, 1946
- Oxydema philippinense Voss, 1951
- Oxydema puncticolle Wollaston, T.V., 1873
- Oxydema simplex Marshall, 1931
- Oxydema stricticollis Zimmerman, 1956
- Oxydema subcaudatus Marshall, 1952
- Oxydema sulcirostre Voss, 1957
