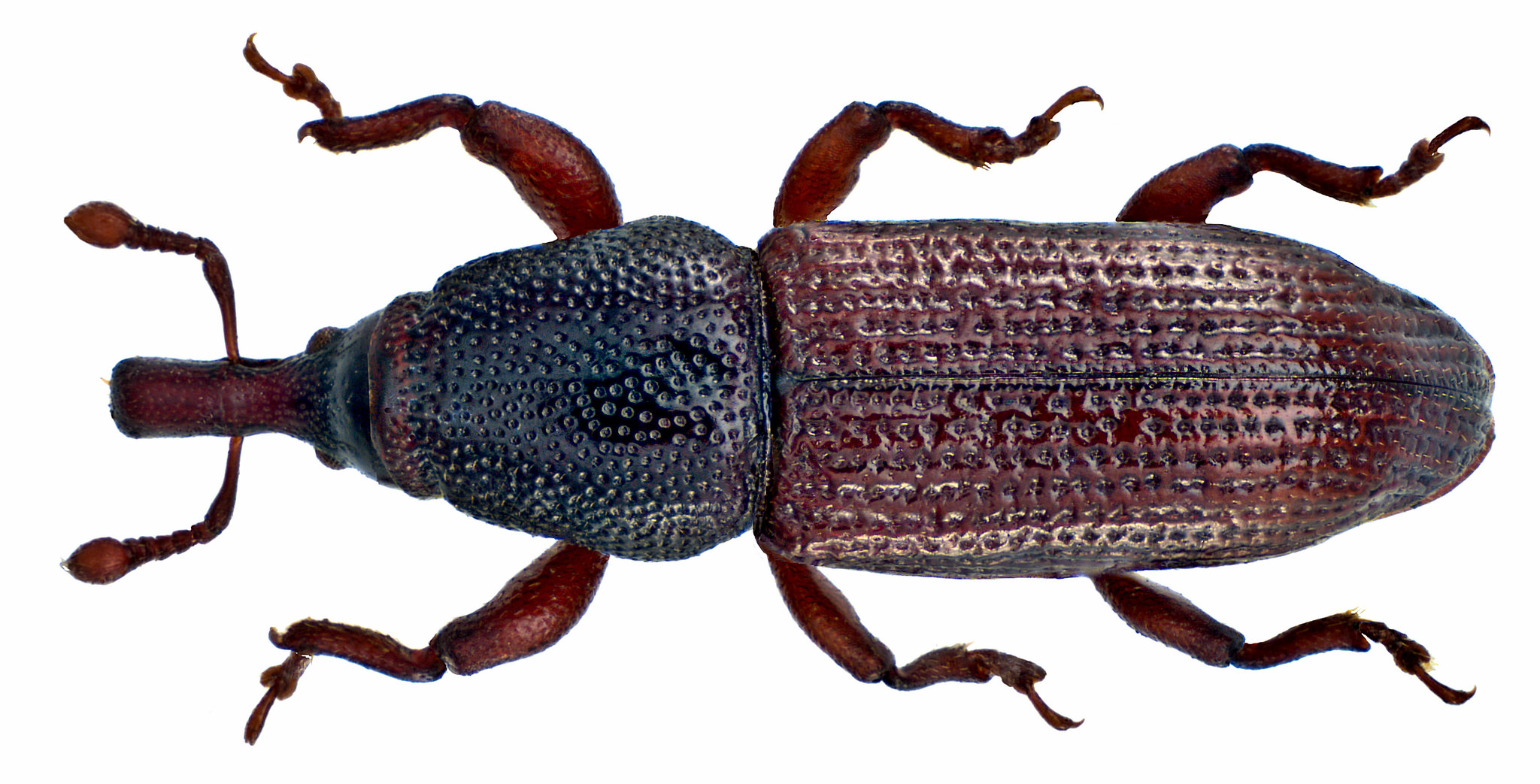

Scientific classification
- Kingdom: Animalia
- Phylum: Arthropoda
- Clade: Pancrustacea
- Class: Insecta
- Order: Coleoptera
- Suborder: Polyphaga
- Infraorder: Cucujiformia
- Superfamily: Curculionoidea
- Family: Curculionidae
- Genus: Pentarthrum
- Species: P. huttoni

Binomial name
- Pentarthrum huttoni Wollaston, 1854

= Pentarthrum huttoni =

Species of beetle

Pentarthrum huttoni is a species of wood boring weevil in family Curculionidae. It has a mainly nearctic distribution, but has also been reported from several European countries. It was first reported in Austria in 2006 when it was found to be the cause of disintegration of historically significant 18th century softwood coffins in the crypt of St. Michael's church in the center of Vienna.

These beetles prefer extremely high humidity (100%), and also prefer to attack wood that is already rotting. Most Central European records are from buildings.
