= Micromimus =

Scientific classification
- Kingdom: Animalia
- Phylum: Arthropoda
- Clade: Pancrustacea
- Class: Insecta
- Order: Coleoptera
- Suborder: Polyphaga
- Infraorder: Cucujiformia
- Superfamily: Curculionoidea
- Family: Curculionidae
- Tribe: Dryotribini
- Genus: Micromimus; Wollaston, 1873

Genus of beetles

Micromimus is a genus of true weevils in the beetle family Curculionidae. There are about 18 described species in Micromimus.

== Species ==
These 18 species belong to the genus Micromimus:

- Micromimus ausus Kuschel, 1959
- Micromimus batesi Wollaston & T.V., 1873
- Micromimus boliviensis Hustache, 1938
- Micromimus brevis Kuschel, 1959
- Micromimus continuus Champion & G.C., 1909
- Micromimus corticalis (Boheman, 1845)
- Micromimus crassicornis Hustache, 1938
- Micromimus cribrosus Champion & G.C., 1909
- Micromimus dehiscens Champion & G.C., 1909
- Micromimus elongatulus Hustache, 1932
- Micromimus fulvus Hustache, 1932
- Micromimus germaini Kuschel, 1959
- Micromimus minimus Champion & G.C., 1909
- Micromimus nigrescens Wollaston & T.V., 1873
- Micromimus orcus Davis & Engel, 2007
- Micromimus osellai Voss, 1968
- Micromimus ovatulus Hustache, 1938
- Micromimus pumilio Wollaston & T.V., 1873
