= Dryotribus =

Scientific classification
- Kingdom: Animalia
- Phylum: Arthropoda
- Clade: Pancrustacea
- Class: Insecta
- Order: Coleoptera
- Suborder: Polyphaga
- Infraorder: Cucujiformia
- Superfamily: Curculionoidea
- Family: Curculionidae
- Tribe: Dryotribini
- Genus: Dryotribus

Genus of beetles

Dryotribus is a genus of beetle in family Curculionidae. It contains the following species:

- Dryotribus amplioculus
- Dryotribus mimeticus
- Dryotribus solitarius
- Dryotribus wilderi
