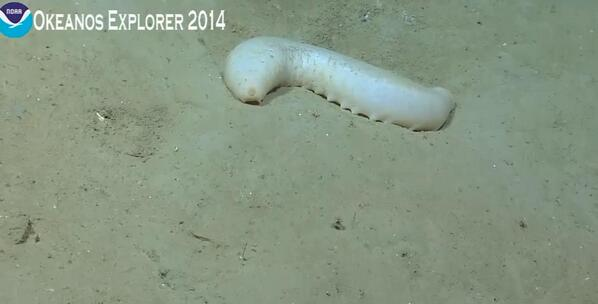
- Mesothuria sp.

Scientific classification
- Kingdom: Animalia
- Phylum: Echinodermata
- Class: Holothuroidea
- Order: Holothuriida
- Family: Mesothuriidae
- Genus: Mesothuria; Ludwig, 1894

Synonyms
- Allantis Hérouard, 1902; Diplasiothuria Heding, 1942; Mesites Ludwig, 1893; Mesothuria (Allantis) Hérouard, 1902; Mesothuria (Diplasiothuria) Heding, 1942; Mesothuria (Mesothuria) Ludwig, 1894; Mesothuria (Monothuria) Heding, 1940; Mesothuria (Penichrothuria) Heding, 1942; Penichrothuria Heding, 1942

= Mesothuria =

Genus of sea cucumbers

Mesothuria is a genus of sea cucumbers belonging to the family Mesothuriidae. The genus has a cosmopolitan distribution.

== Species ==
The following 26 species are recognised in the genus Mesothuria:

- Mesothuria abbreviata Koehler & Vaney, 1905
- Mesothuria bifurcata Hérouard, 1901
- Mesothuria carnosa Fisher, 1907
- Mesothuria cathedralis Heding, 1940
- Mesothuria crebrapedes Cherbonnier & Féral, 1981
- Mesothuria deani Mitsukuri, 1912
- Mesothuria edwardensis Massin, 1992
- Mesothuria gargantua Deichmann, 1930
- Mesothuria holothurioides Sluiter, 1901
- Mesothuria incerta Koehler & Vaney, 1905
- Mesothuria intestinalis (Ascanius, 1805)
- Mesothuria magellani (Ludwig, 1883)
- Mesothuria maroccana Perrier R., 1898
- Mesothuria megapoda Clark, 1920
- Mesothuria milleri Gebruk & Solis-Marin in Gebruk, Solis-Marin, Billett, Rogacheva & Tyler, 2012
- Mesothuria multipes (Ludwig, 1893)
- Mesothuria multipora Clark, 1920
- Mesothuria murrayi (Théel, 1886)
- Mesothuria oktaknemoides Heding, 1940
- Mesothuria oktaknemus Sluiter, 1901
- Mesothuria regularia Heding, 1940
- Mesothuria roulei (Koehler, 1895)
- Mesothuria rugosa Hérouard, 1912
- Mesothuria squamosa Koehler & Vaney, 1905
- Mesothuria sufflava Cherbonnier & Féral, 1984
- Mesothuria verrilli (Théel, 1886)
