= Hexarthrum =

Scientific classification
- Kingdom: Animalia
- Phylum: Arthropoda
- Clade: Pancrustacea
- Class: Insecta
- Order: Coleoptera
- Suborder: Polyphaga
- Infraorder: Cucujiformia
- Superfamily: Curculionoidea
- Family: Curculionidae
- Tribe: Onycholipini
- Genus: Hexarthrum; Wollaston, 1860

Genus of beetles

Hexarthrum is a genus of true weevils in the beetle family Curculionidae. There are about 10 described species in Hexarthrum.

== Species ==
These 10 species belong to the genus Hexarthrum:

- Hexarthrum brevipennis Voss, 1955
- Hexarthrum chaoi Zhang & Osella, 1995
- Hexarthrum chinensis Folwaczny, 1968
- Hexarthrum duplicatum Folwaczny, 1966
- Hexarthrum smreczynskii Folwaczny, 1966
- Hexarthrum thujae Brown, 1966
- Hexarthrum ulkei Horn, 1873 (eastern wood weevil)
- Hexarthrum usambaricum Voss, 1934
- Hexarthrum wushanensis Zhang & Osella, 1995
- Hexarthrum yunnanensis Zhang & Osella, 1995
