= Trichacorynus =

Scientific classification
- Kingdom: Animalia
- Phylum: Arthropoda
- Clade: Pancrustacea
- Class: Insecta
- Order: Coleoptera
- Suborder: Polyphaga
- Infraorder: Cucujiformia
- Superfamily: Curculionoidea
- Family: Curculionidae
- Tribe: Onycholipini
- Genus: Trichacorynus; Blatchley, 1916

Genus of beetles

Trichacorynus is a genus of true weevils in the beetle family Curculionidae. There are at least three described species in Trichacorynus.

== Species ==
These three species belong to the genus Trichacorynus:

- Trichacorynus brunneus Blatchley, 1916
- Trichacorynus protractus (Horn, 1873)
- Trichacorynus sulcirostris Blatchley, 1928
