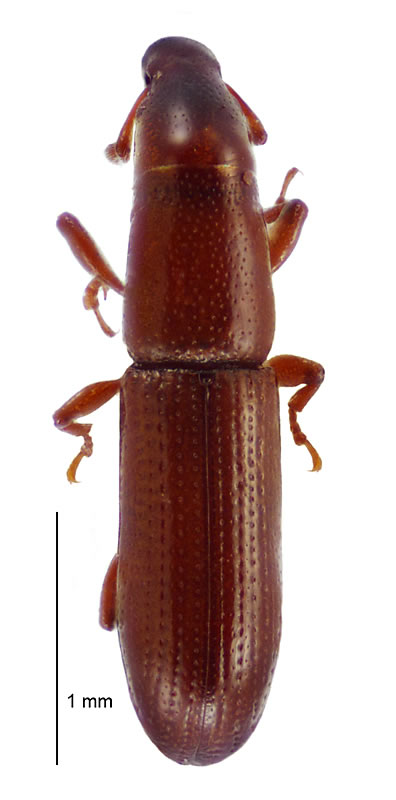
- Macrorhyncolus littoralis

Scientific classification
- Kingdom: Animalia
- Phylum: Arthropoda
- Clade: Pancrustacea
- Class: Insecta
- Order: Coleoptera
- Suborder: Polyphaga
- Infraorder: Cucujiformia
- Superfamily: Curculionoidea
- Family: Curculionidae
- Tribe: Rhyncolini
- Genus: Macrorhyncolus; Wollaston, 1873

= Macrorhyncolus =

Genus of beetles

Macrorhyncolus is a genus of true weevils in the family of beetles known as Curculionidae. There are about five described species in Macrorhyncolus.

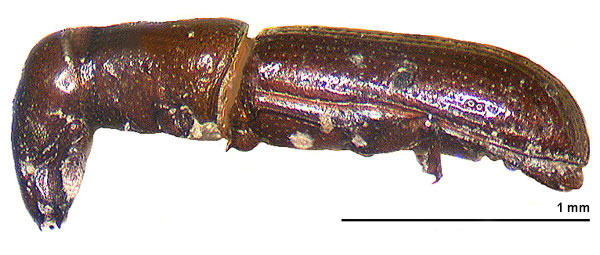
Macrorhyncolus littoralis

== Species ==
These five species belong to the genus Macrorhyncolus:

- Macrorhyncolus crassitarsis Wollaston, T.V., 1873^{c}
- Macrorhyncolus crassiusculus Wollaston, T.V., 1873^{c}
- Macrorhyncolus littoralis Broun (1880)^{g b} (driftwood weevil)
- Macrorhyncolus protractus Horn, G.H., 1873^{c}
- Macrorhyncolus sulcirostris Voss, 1957^{c}

Data sources: i = ITIS, c = Catalogue of Life, g = GBIF, b = Bugguide.net
