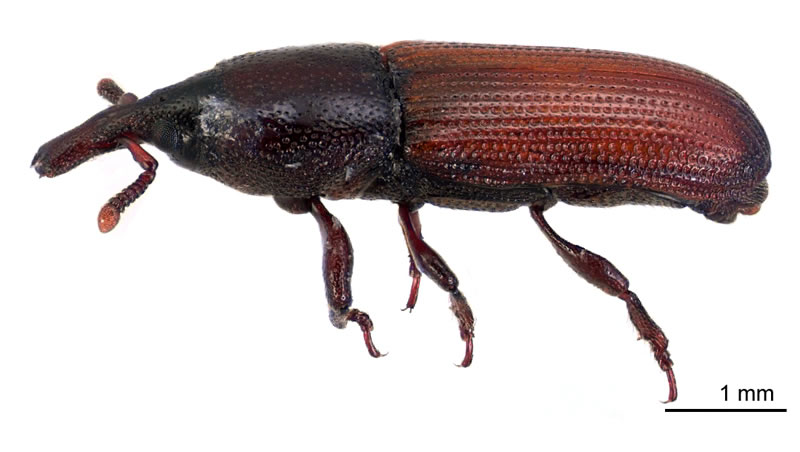
- Mesites pallidipennis

Scientific classification
- Kingdom: Animalia
- Phylum: Arthropoda
- Clade: Pancrustacea
- Class: Insecta
- Order: Coleoptera
- Suborder: Polyphaga
- Infraorder: Cucujiformia
- Superfamily: Curculionoidea
- Family: Curculionidae
- Tribe: Cossonini
- Genus: Mesites; Schönherr, 1838

= Mesites (beetle) =

Genus of beetles

Mesites is a genus of true weevils in the family of beetles known as Curculionidae. There are at least 30 described species in Mesites.

== Species ==
These 31 species belong to the genus Mesites:

- Mesites aequitanus Reitter, E., 1898^{c}
- Mesites akbesianus Desbr., 1894-95^{c}
- Mesites angustior Pic, M., 1900^{c}
- Mesites aquitanus Fairmaire, L., 1859^{c}
- Mesites ater Lindberg, 1950^{c}
- Mesites complanatus Wollaston, T.V., 1861^{c}
- Mesites crassaticornis Peyerimhoff, 1949^{c}
- Mesites cribratus Fairmaire, L., 1856^{c}
- Mesites cribripennis Desbr., 1892-93^{c}
- Mesites cunipes Boheman, 1838^{c}
- Mesites deserticus Escalera, 1914^{c}
- Mesites euphorbiae Wollaston, T.V., 1854^{c}
- Mesites fusiformis Wollaston, T.V., 1861^{c}
- Mesites gomerensis Uyttenboogaart, 1937^{c}
- Mesites hesperus Wollaston, T.V., 1867^{c}
- Mesites hozmani Folwaczny, 1984^{c}
- Mesites maderensis Wollaston, T.V., 1854^{c}
- Mesites mimoides Voss, 1934^{c}
- Mesites mogadoricus Escalera, 1914^{c}
- Mesites nitidicollis Folwaczny, 1973^{c}
- Mesites pallidipennis Boheman, 1838^{c}
- Mesites persimilis Wollaston, T.V., 1861^{c}
- Mesites proximus Wollaston, T.V., 1861^{c}
- Mesites pubipennis Wollaston, T.V., 1861^{c}
- Mesites rubricatus Hoffmann, 1965^{c}
- Mesites rufipennis LeConte, 1878^{i c b}
- Mesites subcylindricus (Horn, 1873)^{i c b}
- Mesites subvittatus Motschulsky, V. de, 1866^{c}
- Mesites suturalis Motschulsky, V. de, 1866^{c}
- Mesites tardyi Curtis, J., 1825^{c}
- Mesites therondi Tempère, 1961^{c}

Data sources: i = ITIS, c = Catalogue of Life, g = GBIF, b = Bugguide.net
