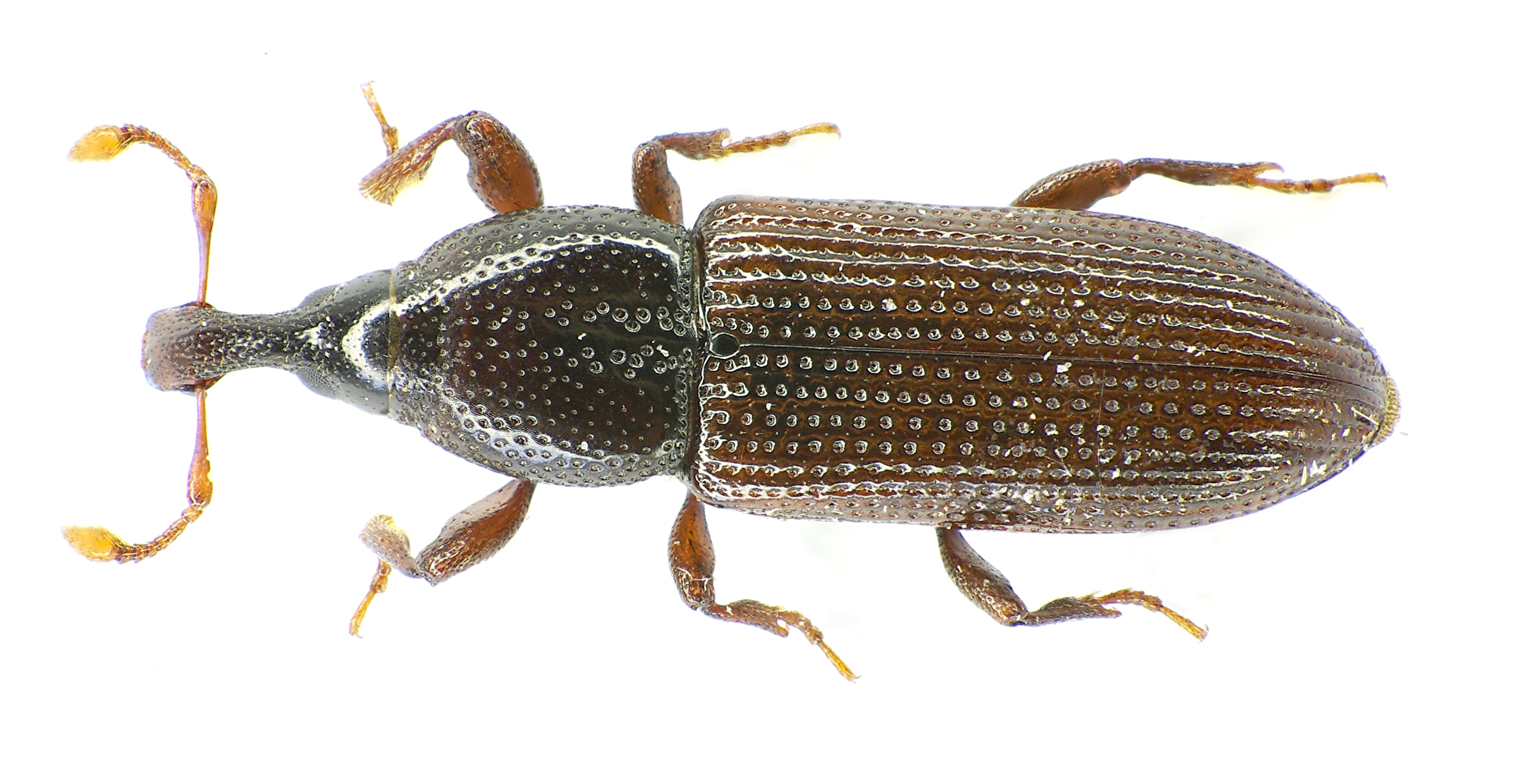
- Cossonus linearis

Scientific classification
- Kingdom: Animalia
- Phylum: Arthropoda
- Clade: Pancrustacea
- Class: Insecta
- Order: Coleoptera
- Suborder: Polyphaga
- Infraorder: Cucujiformia
- Superfamily: Curculionoidea
- Family: Curculionidae
- Subfamily: Cossoninae
- Tribe: Cossonini
- Genus: Cossonus; Clairville, 1798

= Cossonus =

Genus of weevils

Cossonus is a weevil genus.

Species include:

- Cossonus americanus Buchanan, 1936
- Cossonus corticola Say, 1831
- Cossonus crenatus Horn, 1873
- Cossonus ellipticollis Van Dyke, 1915
- Cossonus fossicollis Van Dyke, 1916
- Cossonus hamiltoni Slosson, 1899
- Cossonus hubbardi Schwarz, 1899
- Cossonus impressifrons Boheman, 1838
- Cossonus impressus Boheman, 1838
- Cossonus linearis
- Cossonus lupini Van Dyke, 1915
- Cossonus marginalis
- Cossonus murrayi (Wollaston, 1874)
- Cossonus pacificus Van Dyke, 1916
- Cossonus parallelepipedus
- Cossonus piniphilus Boheman, 1838
- Cossonus platalea Say, 1831
- Cossonus ponderosae Van Dyke, 1915
- Cossonus quadricollis Van Dyke, 1915
- Cossonus rufipennis Buchanan, 1936
- Cossonus schwarzi Van Dyke, 1916
- Cossonus spathula Boheman, 1838
- Cossonus texanus Van Dyke, 1915
