= Coptus =

Coptus may refer to:

- Qift, a place in Egypt
- Coptus (weevil), a beetle genus in the tribe Rhyncolini
