= Phloeophagus canadensis =

Scientific classification
- Kingdom: Animalia
- Phylum: Arthropoda
- Clade: Pancrustacea
- Class: Insecta
- Order: Coleoptera
- Suborder: Polyphaga
- Infraorder: Cucujiformia
- Superfamily: Curculionoidea
- Family: Curculionidae
- Genus: Phloeophagus
- Species: P. canadensis

Binomial name
- Phloeophagus canadensis Van Dyke, 1927

Species of beetle

Phloeophagus canadensis is a species of true weevil in the beetle family Curculionidae. It is found in North America.
