= Stenancylus =

Scientific classification
- Kingdom: Animalia
- Phylum: Arthropoda
- Clade: Pancrustacea
- Class: Insecta
- Order: Coleoptera
- Suborder: Polyphaga
- Infraorder: Cucujiformia
- Superfamily: Curculionoidea
- Family: Curculionidae
- Tribe: Rhyncolini
- Genus: Stenancylus; Casey, 1892

Genus of beetles

Stenancylus is a genus of true weevils in the beetle family Curculionidae. There are about nine described species in Stenancylus.

== Species ==
These nine species belong to the genus Stenancylus:

- Stenancylus chiriquensis Csiki & E., 1936
- Stenancylus colomboi Casey, 1892
- Stenancylus laeviusculus Wibmer & O'Brien, 1986
- Stenancylus linearis Wibmer & O'Brien, 1986
- Stenancylus montivagus Csiki & E., 1936
- Stenancylus punctatus Wibmer & O'Brien, 1986
- Stenancylus similis Wibmer & O'Brien, 1986
- Stenancylus stenosoma (Blatchley, 1916)
- Stenancylus troglodytes Wibmer & O'Brien, 1986
