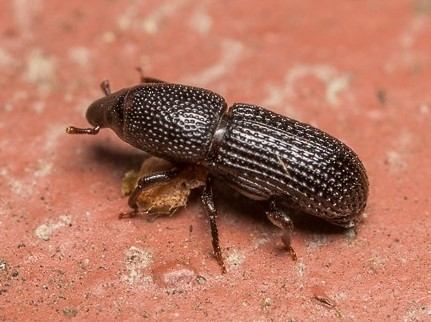

Scientific classification
- Kingdom: Animalia
- Phylum: Arthropoda
- Clade: Pancrustacea
- Class: Insecta
- Order: Coleoptera
- Suborder: Polyphaga
- Infraorder: Cucujiformia
- Superfamily: Curculionoidea
- Family: Curculionidae
- Genus: Tomolips
- Species: T. quercicola

Binomial name
- Tomolips quercicola (Boheman, 1845)

= Tomolips quercicola =

Species of beetle

Tomolips quercicola, the black wood weevil, is a species of true weevil in the beetle family Curculionidae. It is found from Canada to Central America, where it occurs in the damp wood of many tree species, especially oaks.
