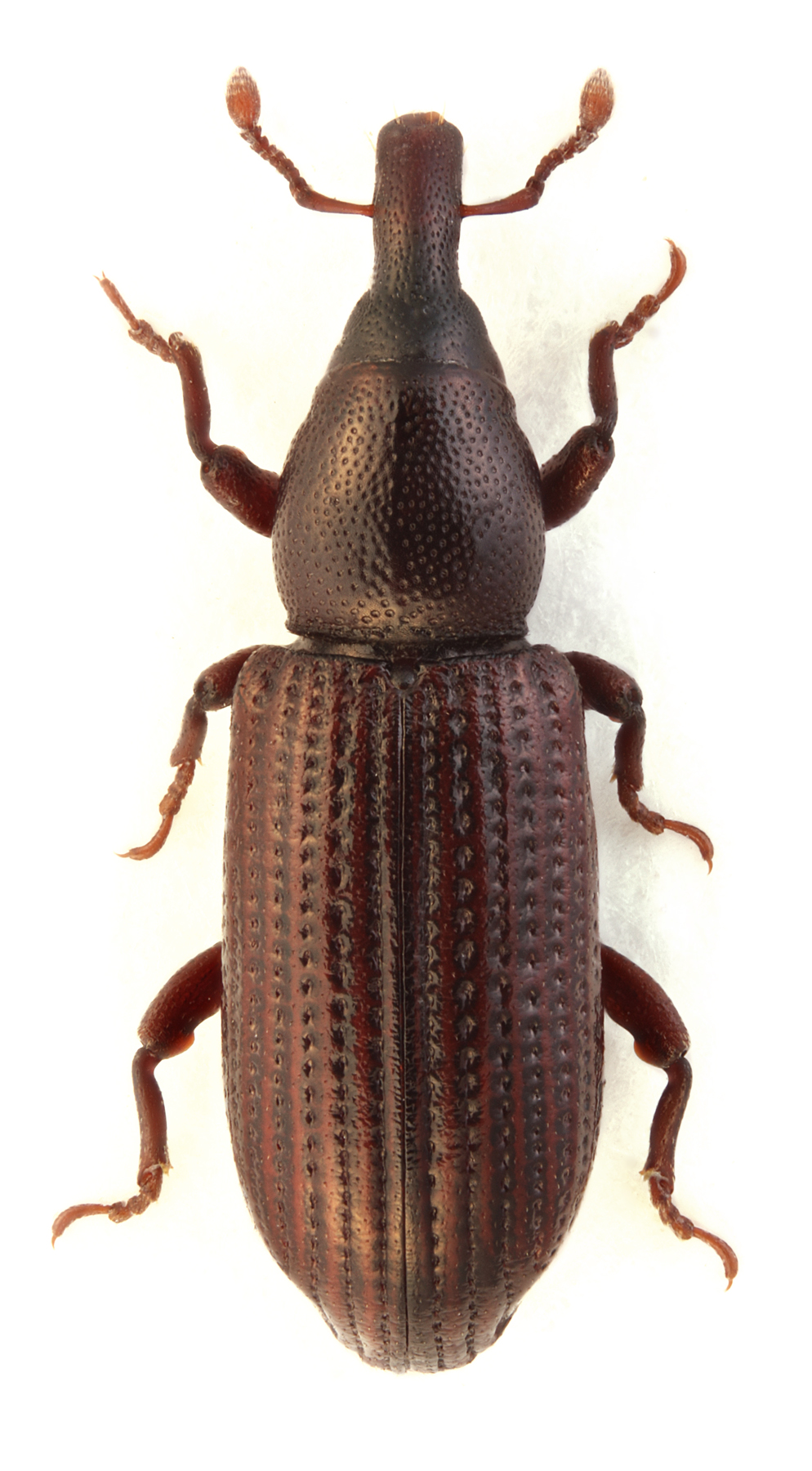
- Phloeophagus turbatus

Scientific classification
- Kingdom: Animalia
- Phylum: Arthropoda
- Clade: Pancrustacea
- Class: Insecta
- Order: Coleoptera
- Suborder: Polyphaga
- Infraorder: Cucujiformia
- Superfamily: Curculionoidea
- Family: Curculionidae
- Tribe: Rhyncolini
- Genus: Phloeophagus; Schönherr, 1838

= Phloeophagus =

Genus of beetles

Phloeophagus is a genus of true weevils in the beetle family Curculionidae. There are more than 30 described species in Phloeophagus.

== Species ==
These 39 species belong to the genus Phloeophagus:

- Phloeophagus aeneopicea Boheman & C.H., 1845
- Phloeophagus aeneopiceus Boheman, 1845
- Phloeophagus apionides Horn, 1873
- Phloeophagus appenhageni Uyttenboogaart, 1930
- Phloeophagus aterrimus Hampe, 1850
- Phloeophagus brignolii Osella, Zuppa & Lodos, 1993
- Phloeophagus californicus Van Dyke, 1927
- Phloeophagus canadensis Van Dyke, 1927
- Phloeophagus cossonoides Motschulsky, 1863
- Phloeophagus depressus Montrouzier & X., 1860
- Phloeophagus ebeninus Boheman, 1838
- Phloeophagus fallax Boheman, 1838
- Phloeophagus ferrugineus Boheman, 1838
- Phloeophagus filum Roudier, 1958
- Phloeophagus hispidus Boheman, 1838
- Phloeophagus iranicus Osella, Zuppa & Lodos, 1993
- Phloeophagus lignarius Schoenherr, 1838
- Phloeophagus linearis Boheman, 1845
- Phloeophagus marginalis Marshall, 1930
- Phloeophagus minimus Boheman, 1838
- Phloeophagus minor Horn, 1873
- Phloeophagus orientalis Osella, 1974
- Phloeophagus pallidus Boheman, 1845
- Phloeophagus pawlowskii Kuska, 1984
- Phloeophagus protensus (Wollaston, 1873)
- Phloeophagus scalptus Schoenherr, 1845
- Phloeophagus sculptus Gyllenhal, 1838
- Phloeophagus seriesetosulus Voss, 1960
- Phloeophagus silbermanni Boheman, 1838
- Phloeophagus solidus Voss, 1965
- Phloeophagus spadix Schoenherr, 1838
- Phloeophagus sucinopunctatus Kuska, 1992
- Phloeophagus tenax Wollaston & T.V., 1854
- Phloeophagus thompsoni (Grill, 1896)
- Phloeophagus turbatus Boheman, 1845
- Phloeophagus ulimi Kuska, 1982
- Phloeophagus uncipes Boheman, 1838
- Phloeophagus variolatus Dury, 1916
- Phloeophagus vossi Osella, 1974
