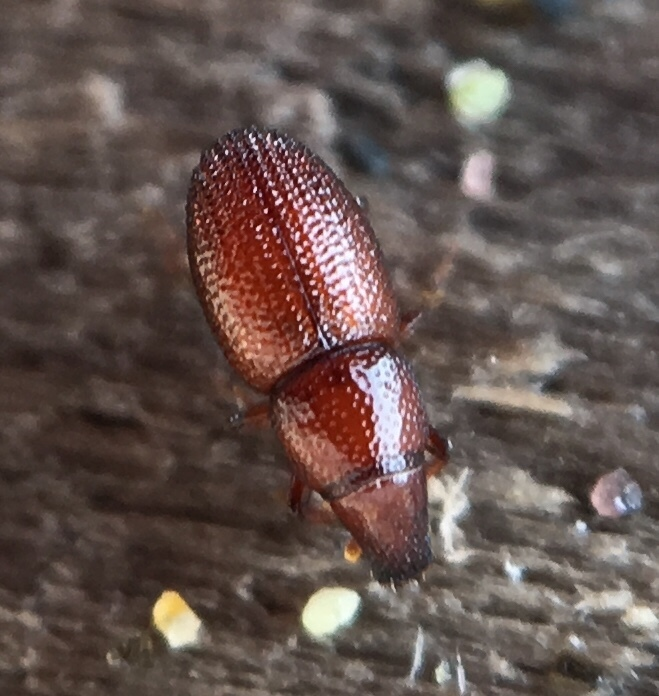

Scientific classification
- Kingdom: Animalia
- Phylum: Arthropoda
- Clade: Pancrustacea
- Class: Insecta
- Order: Coleoptera
- Suborder: Polyphaga
- Infraorder: Cucujiformia
- Superfamily: Curculionoidea
- Family: Curculionidae
- Tribe: Rhyncolini
- Genus: Elassoptes; Horn, 1873
- Species: E. marinus

Binomial name
- Elassoptes marinus Horn, 1873

= Elassoptes =

Genus of beetles

Elassoptes is a genus of true weevils in the beetle family Curculionidae. It is monotypic, containing the single species Elassoptes marinus.
