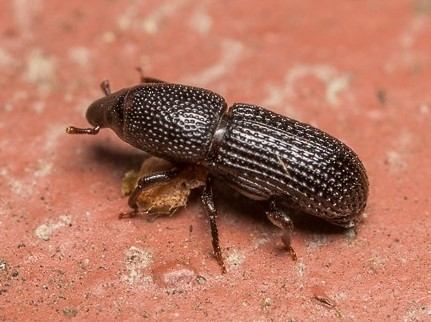
- Tomolips quercicola

Scientific classification
- Kingdom: Animalia
- Phylum: Arthropoda
- Clade: Pancrustacea
- Class: Insecta
- Order: Coleoptera
- Suborder: Polyphaga
- Infraorder: Cucujiformia
- Superfamily: Curculionoidea
- Family: Curculionidae
- Tribe: Rhyncolini
- Genus: Tomolips; Wollaston, 1873

= Tomolips =

Genus of beetles

Tomolips is a genus of true weevils in the beetle family Curculionidae. There are at least four described species in Tomolips.

== Species ==
These four species belong to the genus Tomolips:

- Tomolips asperatus Wollaston & T.V., 1873
- Tomolips bicalcaratus Wollaston & T.V., 1873
- Tomolips pinicola Voss, 1953
- Tomolips quercicola (Boheman, 1845) (black wood weevil)
