= Apotrepus =

Scientific classification
- Kingdom: Animalia
- Phylum: Arthropoda
- Clade: Pancrustacea
- Class: Insecta
- Order: Coleoptera
- Suborder: Polyphaga
- Infraorder: Cucujiformia
- Superfamily: Curculionoidea
- Family: Curculionidae
- Tribe: Rhyncolini
- Genus: Apotrepus; Casey, 1892

Genus of beetles

Apotrepus is a genus of true weevils in the beetle family Curculionidae. There are about 10 described species in Apotrepus.

== Species ==
These 10 species belong to the genus Apotrepus:

- Apotrepus delauneyi Hustache, 1932
- Apotrepus densicollis Casey, 1892
- Apotrepus dufaui Hustache, 1932
- Apotrepus enigmaticus Hustache, 1932
- Apotrepus guadelupensis Hustache, 1932
- Apotrepus hypocritus Hustache, 1932
- Apotrepus puncticollis Boheman, 1838
- Apotrepus sulcatifrons Hustache, 1932
- Apotrepus sulcatirostris Hustache, 1932
- Apotrepus vitraci Hustache, 1932
