= Macrancylus =

Scientific classification
- Kingdom: Animalia
- Phylum: Arthropoda
- Clade: Pancrustacea
- Class: Insecta
- Order: Coleoptera
- Suborder: Polyphaga
- Infraorder: Cucujiformia
- Superfamily: Curculionoidea
- Family: Curculionidae
- Tribe: Rhyncolini
- Genus: Macrancylus

Genus of beetles

Macrancylus is a genus of beetle in family Curculionidae. It contains the following species:

- Macrancylus linearis (extinct)
