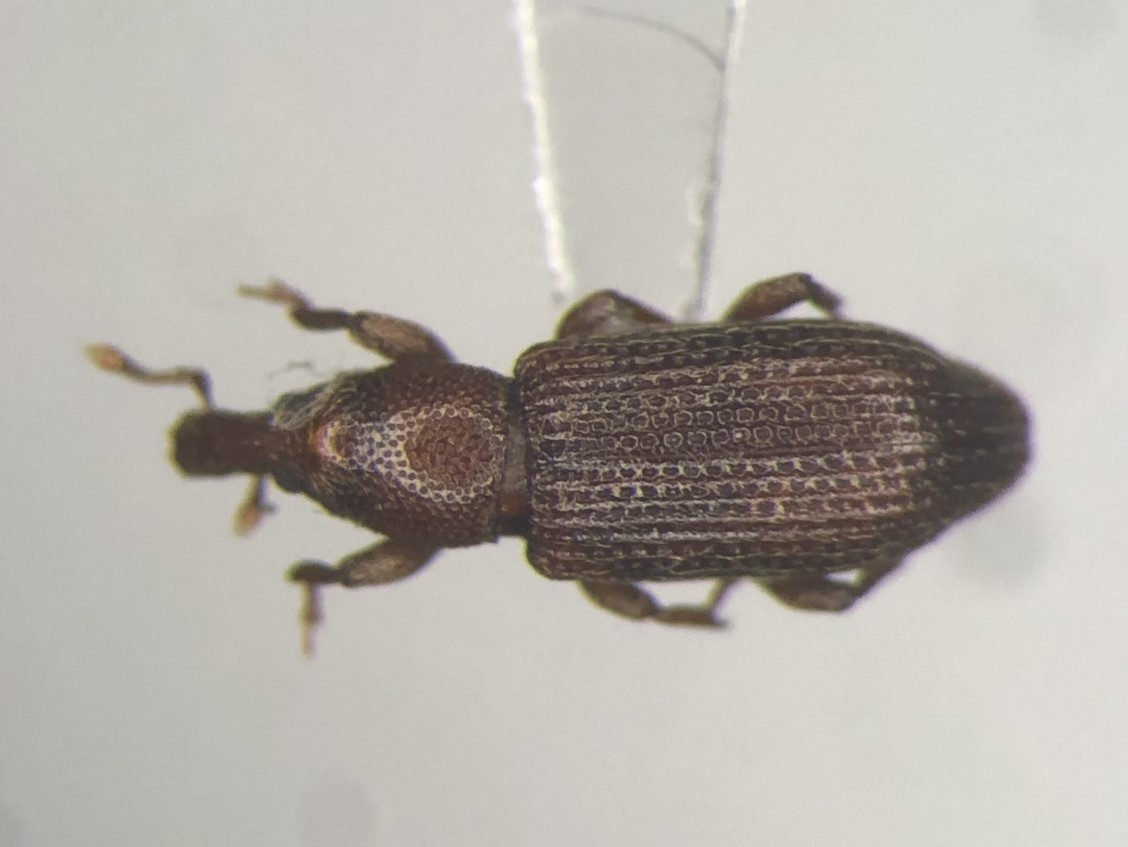
- Carphonotus testaceus

Scientific classification
- Kingdom: Animalia
- Phylum: Arthropoda
- Clade: Pancrustacea
- Class: Insecta
- Order: Coleoptera
- Suborder: Polyphaga
- Infraorder: Cucujiformia
- Superfamily: Curculionoidea
- Family: Curculionidae
- Tribe: Rhyncolini
- Genus: Carphonotus; Casey, 1892

= Carphonotus =

Genus of beetles

Carphonotus is a genus of true weevils in the beetle family Curculionidae. There are at least two described species in the genus Carphonotus.

== Species ==
These two species belong to the genus Carphonotus:

- Carphonotus ochreipilis Champion & G.C., 1909
- Carphonotus testaceus Casey, 1892
