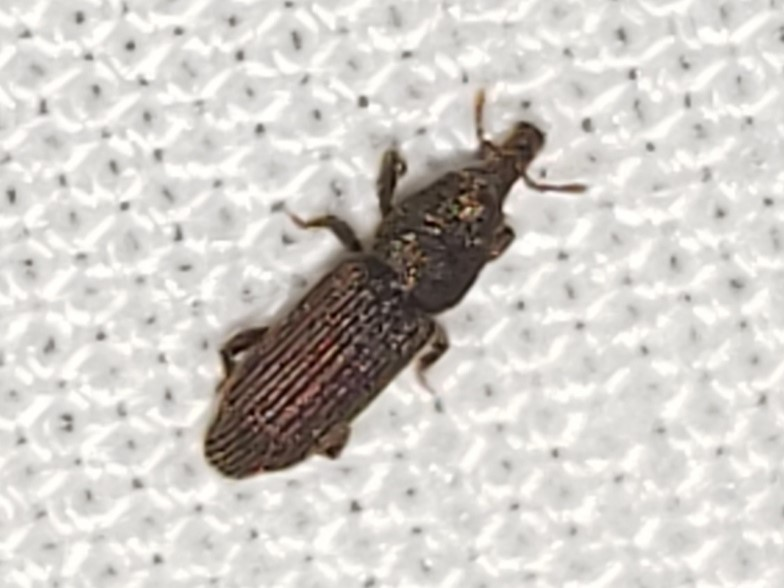
- Himatium errans

Scientific classification
- Kingdom: Animalia
- Phylum: Arthropoda
- Clade: Pancrustacea
- Class: Insecta
- Order: Coleoptera
- Suborder: Polyphaga
- Infraorder: Cucujiformia
- Superfamily: Curculionoidea
- Family: Curculionidae
- Tribe: Rhyncolini
- Genus: Himatium; Wollaston, 1873

= Himatium =

Genus of beetles

Himatium is a genus of snout and bark beetles in the family Curculionidae. There are at least two described species in the genus Himatium.

== Species ==
- Himatium conicum LeConte, 1880
- Himatium errans LeConte, 1876
