= Apotrepus densicollis =

Scientific classification
- Kingdom: Animalia
- Phylum: Arthropoda
- Clade: Pancrustacea
- Class: Insecta
- Order: Coleoptera
- Suborder: Polyphaga
- Infraorder: Cucujiformia
- Superfamily: Curculionoidea
- Family: Curculionidae
- Genus: Apotrepus
- Species: A. densicollis

Binomial name
- Apotrepus densicollis Casey, 1892

Species of beetle

Apotrepus densicollis is a species of true weevil in the beetle family Curculionidae. It is found in Arizona (USA) and Baja California (Mexico). Adults are associated with dead saguaro and other cacti.
