= Macrancylus linearis =

Conservation status
- Least Concern (IUCN 3.1)

Scientific classification
- Kingdom: Animalia
- Phylum: Arthropoda
- Clade: Pancrustacea
- Class: Insecta
- Order: Coleoptera
- Suborder: Polyphaga
- Infraorder: Cucujiformia
- Superfamily: Curculionoidea
- Family: Curculionidae
- Genus: Macrancylus
- Species: M. linearis

Binomial name
- Macrancylus linearis LeConte, 1876

Species of beetle

Macrancylus linearis is a species of terrestrial beetle in family Curculionidae. It is believed to have originated in the Pacific, having been introduced in mainland USA. It is currently distributions includes Hawaii, Texas, Florida and the West Indies. The insect was found along shorelines, specifically in driftwood.
