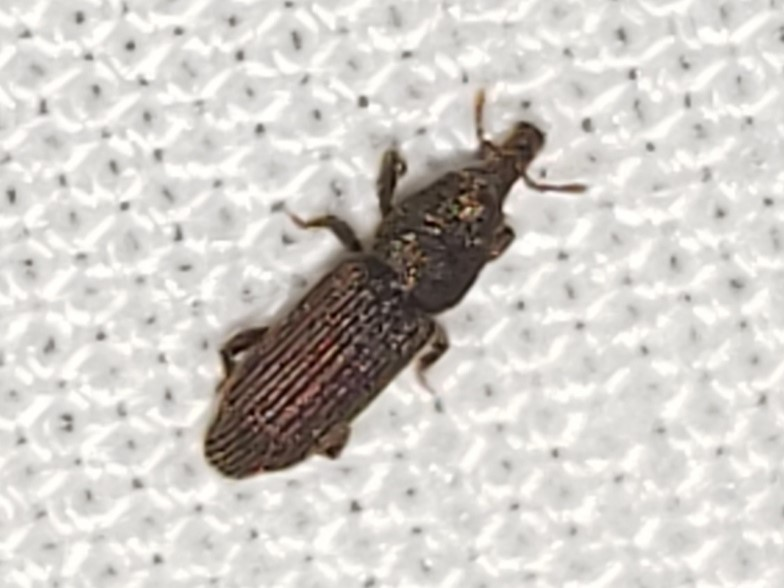

Scientific classification
- Kingdom: Animalia
- Phylum: Arthropoda
- Clade: Pancrustacea
- Class: Insecta
- Order: Coleoptera
- Suborder: Polyphaga
- Infraorder: Cucujiformia
- Superfamily: Curculionoidea
- Family: Curculionidae
- Genus: Himatium
- Species: H. errans

Binomial name
- Himatium errans LeConte, 1876

Synonyms
- Himatium nigritulum Casey, 1892; Himatium parvula Blatchley, 1916

= Himatium errans =

Species of beetle

Himatium errans is a species of snout or bark beetle in the family Curculionidae. It is found in North America.
