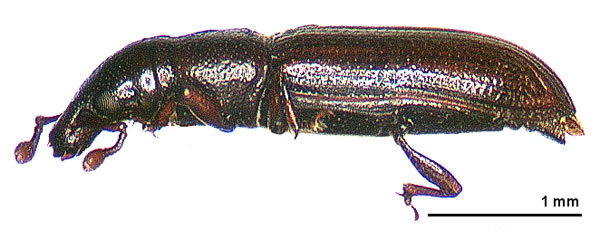
- Pachyops dubius

Scientific classification
- Kingdom: Animalia
- Phylum: Arthropoda
- Clade: Pancrustacea
- Class: Insecta
- Order: Coleoptera
- Suborder: Polyphaga
- Infraorder: Cucujiformia
- Superfamily: Curculionoidea
- Family: Curculionidae
- Subfamily: Cossoninae
- Tribe: Rhyncolini; Gistel, 1856

Genera
- See text

= Rhyncolini =

Tribe of beetles

Rhyncolini is a tribe of beetles in the subfamily Cossoninae.

== Genera ==
Amasinus - Anolethrus - Anotheorus - Aphanommata - Apomimus - Apotrepus - Brachyscapus - Carphonotus - Catamimus - Caulosomus - Coptodes - Coptus - Cotasterosoma - Elassoptes - Euryrrhinus - Exostenoscelis - Eutornopsis - Heptarthrum - Hexarthroides - Himatium - Isochronanus - Leptodemasius - Macrancylus - Muschanella - Neohexarthrum - Neorhyncolus - Omeretes - Oodemas - Pachymastax - Pachyops - Pachystylus - Pentarhyncolus - Phloeophagosoma - Phloeophagus - Proleptomimus - Protamorphoceras - Protoplatypus - Pseudencoptus - Pseudocatolethrus - Pseudomimus - Pseudotanaos - Rhyncolus - Stenancylus - Stenomimodes - Stenoscelidus - Tetraclerus - Tomolips - Xenomimites - Xenotrupis
