= R. vinacea =

R. vinacea may refer to:

- Ropica vinacea, a species of beetle
- Roseomonas vinacea, a species of Gram negative bacteria
