= Ropica duboisi =

Scientific classification
- Kingdom: Animalia
- Phylum: Arthropoda
- Class: Insecta
- Order: Coleoptera
- Suborder: Polyphaga
- Infraorder: Cucujiformia
- Family: Cerambycidae
- Genus: Ropica
- Species: R. duboisi

Binomial name
- Ropica duboisi (Fairmaire, 1850)

Species of beetle

Ropica duboisi is a species of beetle in the family Cerambycidae. It was described by Fairmaire in 1850.
