= Ropica marmorata =

Scientific classification
- Kingdom: Animalia
- Phylum: Arthropoda
- Class: Insecta
- Order: Coleoptera
- Suborder: Polyphaga
- Infraorder: Cucujiformia
- Family: Cerambycidae
- Genus: Ropica
- Species: R. marmorata

Binomial name
- Ropica marmorata Breuning, 1939

Species of beetle

Ropica marmorata is a species of beetle in the family Cerambycidae. It was described by Breuning in 1939. It contains the subspecies Ropica marmorata marmorata and Ropica marmorata sarawakiana.
