= Ropica lachrymosa =

Scientific classification
- Domain: Eukaryota
- Kingdom: Animalia
- Phylum: Arthropoda
- Class: Insecta
- Order: Coleoptera
- Suborder: Polyphaga
- Infraorder: Cucujiformia
- Family: Cerambycidae
- Genus: Ropica
- Species: R. lachrymosa

Binomial name
- Ropica lachrymosa Pascoe, 1865

Species of beetle

Ropica lachrymosa is a species of beetle in the family Cerambycidae. It was described by Pascoe in 1865.
