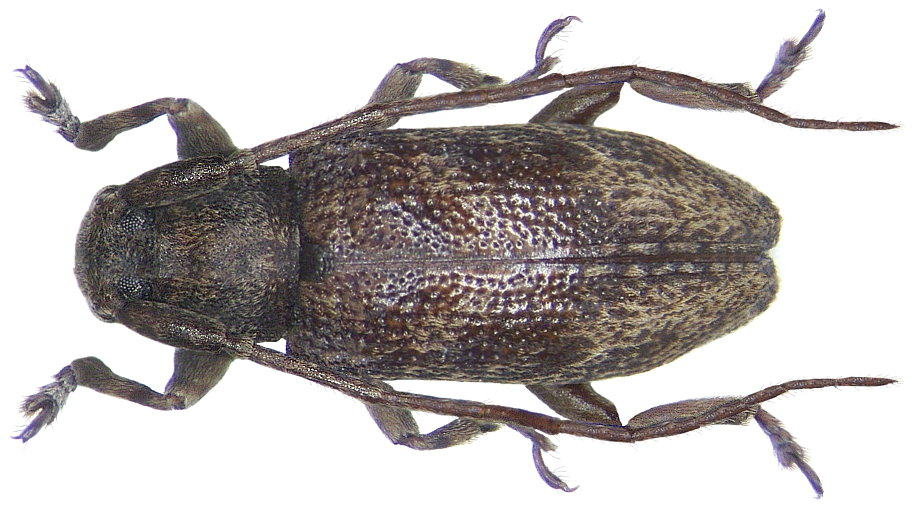

Scientific classification
- Domain: Eukaryota
- Kingdom: Animalia
- Phylum: Arthropoda
- Class: Insecta
- Order: Coleoptera
- Suborder: Polyphaga
- Infraorder: Cucujiformia
- Family: Cerambycidae
- Genus: Ropica; Pascoe, 1858

= Ropica =

Genus of beetles

Ropica is a genus of beetles in the family Cerambycidae, containing the following species:

- Ropica affinis Breuning, 1939
- Ropica africana Breuning, 1939
- Ropica albomaculata Pic, 1945
- Ropica albomarmorata Breuning, 1939
- Ropica alboplagiata Gahan, 1907
- Ropica albostictipennis Breuning, 1949
- Ropica albotecta Breuning, 1961
- Ropica albovariegata Breuning, 1942
- Ropica analis Pascoe, 1865
- Ropica andamana Breuning, 1973
- Ropica angusticollis Pascoe, 1865
- Ropica annamensis Breuning, 1939
- Ropica assamensis Breuning, 1971
- Ropica assimilis Breuning, 1939
- Ropica baloghi Breuning, 1975
- Ropica barbieri Breuning, 1982
- Ropica basicristata Breuning, 1939
- Ropica batchianensis Breuning, 1973
- Ropica beccarii Breuning, 1939
- Ropica bicostata (Pic, 1926)
- Ropica bicristata Breuning, 1939
- Ropica bifuscoplagiata Breuning, 1960
- Ropica binhana (Pic, 1926)
- Ropica biplagiata Breuning, 1939
- Ropica biroi Breuning, 1953
- Ropica bisbilineata (Pic, 1926)
- Ropica borneotica Breuning, 1939
- Ropica brunnea Breuning, 1939
- Ropica carinipennis Breuning, 1954
- Ropica celebensis Breuning, 1939
- Ropica ceylonica Breuning, 1939
- Ropica coenosa Matsushita, 1933
- Ropica congoana Breuning, 1939
- Ropica congolensis Breuning, 1948
- Ropica coomani Pic, 1926
- Ropica coreana Breuning
- Ropica crassepuncta Breuning & de Jong, 1941
- Ropica cruciata Breuning, 1939
- Ropica cunicularis Pascoe, 1865
- Ropica densealbostictica Breuning, 1975
- Ropica densepunctata Breuning & de Jong, 1941
- Ropica didyma Pascoe, 1865
- Ropica dissonans Gahan, 1907
- Ropica dorsalis Schwarzer, 1925
- Ropica duboisi (Fairmaire, 1850)
- Ropica elongata Breuning, 1939
- Ropica elongatula Breuning, 1939
- Ropica evitata Pascoe, 1865
- Ropica exigua Breuning, 1939
- Ropica exocentroides Pascoe, 1859
- Ropica formosana Bates, 1866
- Ropica forticornis Breuning, 1942
- Ropica fouqueti Pic, 1938
- Ropica fruhstorferi Breuning, 1961
- Ropica fulvostictica Breuning & de Jong, 1941
- Ropica fuscicollis Pascoe, 1865
- Ropica fuscobiplagiata Breuning, 1942
- Ropica fuscobiplagiatipennis Breuning, 1964
- Ropica fuscobivittata Breuning, 1939
- Ropica fuscolaterimaculata Hayashi, 1974
- Ropica fuscomaculata Breuning, 1943
- Ropica fuscoplagiata Breuning, 1973
- Ropica fuscosignata Breuning, 1972
- Ropica fuscovariegata Breuning, 1939
- Ropica gardneri Breuning, 1939
- Ropica ghanaensis Breuning, 1978
- Ropica ghesquierei Breuning, 1948
- Ropica granuliscapa Breuning, 1942
- Ropica griseomarmorata Breuning, 1939
- Ropica griseosparsa Pic, 1927
- Ropica grossepunctata Breuning, 1939
- Ropica hayashii Breuning, 1958
- Ropica hebridarum Breuning, 1939
- Ropica hoana Pic, 1932
- Ropica honesta Pascoe, 1865
- Ropica ignobilis Newman, 1842
- Ropica illiterata Pascoe, 1865
- Ropica immista Newman, 1842
- Ropica indica Breuning, 1939
- Ropica indigna Pascoe, 1865
- Ropica ituriensis Breuning, 1972
- Ropica javana Breuning, 1939
- Ropica javanica Breuning, 1939
- Ropica kasaiensis Breuning, 1948
- Ropica kaszabi Breuning, 1975
- Ropica keyensis Breuning, 1953
- Ropica lachrymosa Pascoe, 1865
- Ropica laevicollis Breuning, 1964
- Ropica latepubens Pic, 1951
- Ropica laterifusca Breuning & de Jong, 1941
- Ropica lineatithorax Pic, 1927
- Ropica longula Breuning, 1939
- Ropica loochooana (Matsushita, 1933)
- Ropica luzonica Breuning, 1939
- Ropica marmorata Breuning, 1939
- Ropica mediofasciata Breuning, 1939
- Ropica mizoguchii Hayashi, 1956
- Ropica neopomeriana Breuning, 1939
- Ropica ngauchilae Gressitt, 1940
- Ropica nicobarica Breuning, 1939
- Ropica nigroscutellaris (Breuning, 1943)
- Ropica nigroscutellata Breuning, 1939
- Ropica nigrovittata Breuning, 1940
- Ropica nodieri Pic, 1945
- Ropica obliquebilineata Breuning, 1973
- Ropica obliquelineata Breuning, 1939
- Ropica ochreomaculata Breuning, 1969
- Ropica palauana (Matsushita, 1935)
- Ropica palawanica Breuning, 1939
- Ropica papuana Breuning, 1939
- Ropica paruniformis Breuning, 1969
- Ropica philippinensis Breuning, 1939
- Ropica piperata Pascoe, 1858
- Ropica postmaculata Breuning, 1978
- Ropica principis Breuning, 1939
- Ropica proxima Breuning, 1939
- Ropica pseudosignata Breuning, 1939
- Ropica punctiscapa Breuning, 1969
- Ropica pygmaea Breuning, 1939
- Ropica quadricristata Breuning, 1939
- Ropica rivulosa Pascoe, 1865
- Ropica robusta Fisher, 1925
- Ropica rosti Breuning, 1958
- Ropica rufonotata Pic, 1926
- Ropica rugiscapa Breuning, 1939
- Ropica salomonum Breuning, 1939
- Ropica samoana Breuning, 1939
- Ropica schurmanni Breuning, 1983
- Ropica sechellarum Breuning, 1957
- Ropica servilis Pascoe, 1865
- Ropica signata Pic, 1932
- Ropica signatoides Breuning, 1939
- Ropica siporensis Breuning, 1939
- Ropica sparsepunctata Breuning, 1940
- Ropica sparsepunctiscapus Breuning, 1975
- Ropica squamosa Newman, 1842
- Ropica squamulosa Breuning, 1939
- Ropica stolata Pascoe, 1865
- Ropica strandi Breuning, 1942
- Ropica sublineata Gressitt, 1940
- Ropica subnotata Pic, 1925
- Ropica sumatrensis Breuning, 1939
- Ropica tamborensis Breuning, 1956
- Ropica tentata Pascoe, 1865
- Ropica theresae Pic, 1944
- Ropica thomensis Breuning, 1970
- Ropica timorlautensis Breuning, 1939
- Ropica tongae Breuning, 1973
- Ropica transversemaculata Breuning, 1942
- Ropica tsushimensis Hayashi, 1972
- Ropica umbrata Gressitt, 1951
- Ropica unicolor Breuning, 1939
- Ropica uniformis Breuning, 1948
- Ropica unifuscomaculata Breuning, 1974
- Ropica variabilis Schwarzer, 1925
- Ropica varicolor Breuning, 1939
- Ropica variegata Fisher, 1925
- Ropica varipennis Pascoe, 1859
- Ropica vietnamensis Breuning, 1972
- Ropica vinacea Pascoe, 1865
- Ropica vitiana Breuning, 1939
- Ropica vittata Breuning, 1939
- Ropica wallisi Breuning, 1970
- Ropica yapana Gressitt, 1956
