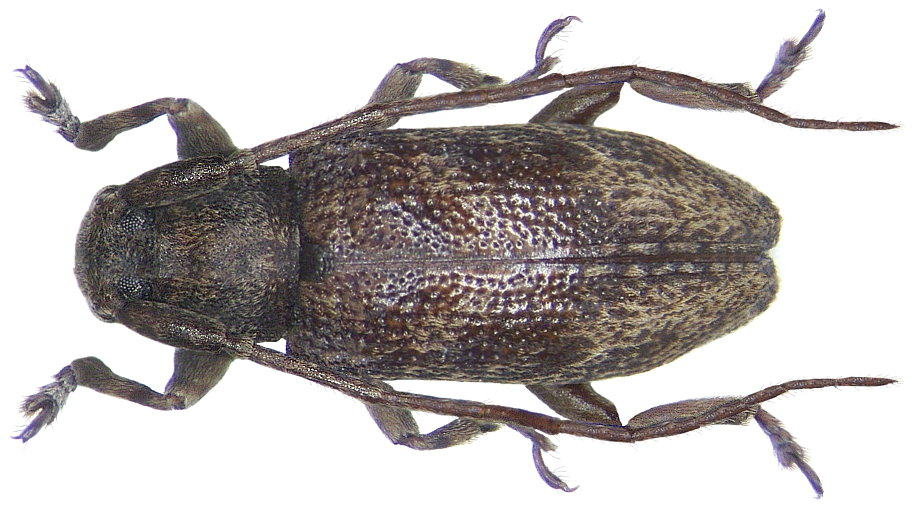

Scientific classification
- Domain: Eukaryota
- Kingdom: Animalia
- Phylum: Arthropoda
- Class: Insecta
- Order: Coleoptera
- Suborder: Polyphaga
- Infraorder: Cucujiformia
- Family: Cerambycidae
- Genus: Ropica
- Species: R. indigna

Binomial name
- Ropica indigna Pascoe, 1865

= Ropica indigna =

Species of beetle

Ropica indigna is a species of beetle in the family Cerambycidae. It was described by Pascoe in 1865.
