= Ropica illiterata =

Scientific classification
- Kingdom: Animalia
- Phylum: Arthropoda
- Clade: Pancrustacea
- Class: Insecta
- Order: Coleoptera
- Suborder: Polyphaga
- Infraorder: Cucujiformia
- Family: Cerambycidae
- Genus: Ropica
- Species: R. illiterata

Binomial name
- Ropica illiterata Pascoe, 1865

Species of beetle

Ropica illiterata is a species of longhorn beetle in the family Cerambycidae. It was described by Pascoe in 1865. It is known from Borneo and Sumatra.
