= Ropica gardneri =

Scientific classification
- Kingdom: Animalia
- Phylum: Arthropoda
- Class: Insecta
- Order: Coleoptera
- Suborder: Polyphaga
- Infraorder: Cucujiformia
- Family: Cerambycidae
- Genus: Ropica
- Species: R. gardneri

Binomial name
- Ropica gardneri Breuning, 1939

Species of beetle

Ropica gardneri is a species of beetle in the family Cerambycidae. It was described by Breuning in 1939.

It is 6 mm long and 1.5 mm wide, and its type locality is Kotturpuram, Chennai. It was named in honor of J. C. M. Gardner, an entomologist who worked in Dehradun.
