= Ropica coenosa =

Scientific classification
- Domain: Eukaryota
- Kingdom: Animalia
- Phylum: Arthropoda
- Class: Insecta
- Order: Coleoptera
- Suborder: Polyphaga
- Infraorder: Cucujiformia
- Family: Cerambycidae
- Genus: Ropica
- Species: R. coenosa

Binomial name
- Ropica coenosa Matsushita, 1933

Species of beetle

Ropica coenosa is a species of beetle in the family Cerambycidae. It was described by Matsushita in 1933. It is known from Japan.
