= Ropica celebensis =

Scientific classification
- Domain: Eukaryota
- Kingdom: Animalia
- Phylum: Arthropoda
- Class: Insecta
- Order: Coleoptera
- Suborder: Polyphaga
- Infraorder: Cucujiformia
- Family: Cerambycidae
- Genus: Ropica
- Species: R. celebensis

Binomial name
- Ropica celebensis Breuning, 1939

Species of beetle

Ropica celebensis is a species of beetle in the family Cerambycidae. It was described by Breuning in 1939.
