= Ropica latepubens =

Scientific classification
- Kingdom: Animalia
- Phylum: Arthropoda
- Class: Insecta
- Order: Coleoptera
- Suborder: Polyphaga
- Infraorder: Cucujiformia
- Family: Cerambycidae
- Genus: Ropica
- Species: R. latepubens

Binomial name
- Ropica latepubens Pic, 1951

Species of beetle

Ropica latepubens is a species of beetle in the family Cerambycidae. It was described by Pic in 1951.
