= Ropica squamosa =

Scientific classification
- Domain: Eukaryota
- Kingdom: Animalia
- Phylum: Arthropoda
- Class: Insecta
- Order: Coleoptera
- Suborder: Polyphaga
- Infraorder: Cucujiformia
- Family: Cerambycidae
- Genus: Ropica
- Species: R. squamosa

Binomial name
- Ropica squamosa Newman, 1842

Species of beetle

Ropica squamosa is a species of beetle in the family Cerambycidae. It was described by Newman in 1842.
