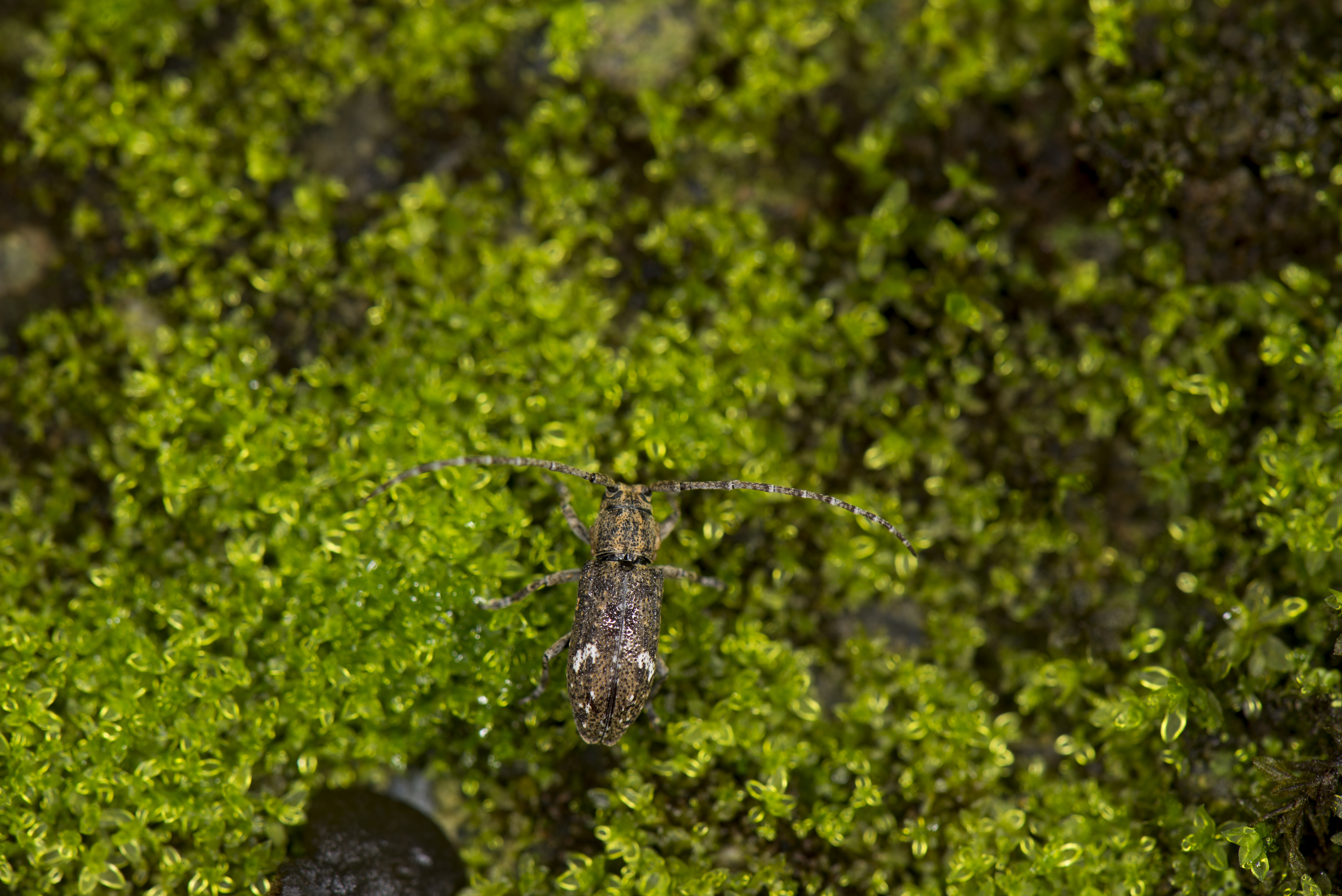

Scientific classification
- Domain: Eukaryota
- Kingdom: Animalia
- Phylum: Arthropoda
- Class: Insecta
- Order: Coleoptera
- Suborder: Polyphaga
- Infraorder: Cucujiformia
- Family: Cerambycidae
- Genus: Ropica
- Species: R. dorsalis

Binomial name
- Ropica dorsalis Schwarzer, 1925

= Ropica dorsalis =

Species of beetle

Ropica dorsalis is a species of beetle in the family Cerambycidae. It was described by Schwarzer in 1925.
