= Ropica nodieri =

Scientific classification
- Kingdom: Animalia
- Phylum: Arthropoda
- Class: Insecta
- Order: Coleoptera
- Suborder: Polyphaga
- Infraorder: Cucujiformia
- Family: Cerambycidae
- Genus: Ropica
- Species: R. nodieri

Binomial name
- Ropica nodieri Pic, 1945

Species of beetle

Ropica nodieri is a species of beetle in the family Cerambycidae. It was described by Maurice Pic in 1945.
