= Ropica piperata =

Scientific classification
- Kingdom: Animalia
- Phylum: Arthropoda
- Class: Insecta
- Order: Coleoptera
- Suborder: Polyphaga
- Infraorder: Cucujiformia
- Family: Cerambycidae
- Genus: Ropica
- Species: R. piperata

Binomial name
- Ropica piperata Pascoe, 1858

Synonyms
- Ropica posticalis Pascoe, 1858

Species of beetle

Ropica piperata is a species of beetle belonging to the family Cerambycidae. It was described by Pascoe in 1858. It is known from Borneo and Malaysia.
