= Ropica sechellarum =

Scientific classification
- Kingdom: Animalia
- Phylum: Arthropoda
- Class: Insecta
- Order: Coleoptera
- Suborder: Polyphaga
- Infraorder: Cucujiformia
- Family: Cerambycidae
- Genus: Ropica
- Species: R. sechellarum

Binomial name
- Ropica sechellarum Breuning, 1957

Species of beetle

Ropica sechellarum is a species of beetle in the family Cerambycidae. It was described by Breuning in 1957. It contains the subspecies Ropica sechellarum interruptefasciata and Ropica sechellarum sechellarum.
