= Ropica ngauchilae =

Scientific classification
- Domain: Eukaryota
- Kingdom: Animalia
- Phylum: Arthropoda
- Class: Insecta
- Order: Coleoptera
- Suborder: Polyphaga
- Infraorder: Cucujiformia
- Family: Cerambycidae
- Genus: Ropica
- Species: R. ngauchilae

Binomial name
- Ropica ngauchilae Gressitt, 1940

Species of beetle

Ropica ngauchilae is a species of beetle in the family Cerambycidae. It was described by Gressitt in 1940.
