= Ropica varipennis =

Scientific classification
- Domain: Eukaryota
- Kingdom: Animalia
- Phylum: Arthropoda
- Class: Insecta
- Order: Coleoptera
- Suborder: Polyphaga
- Infraorder: Cucujiformia
- Family: Cerambycidae
- Genus: Ropica
- Species: R. varipennis

Binomial name
- Ropica varipennis Pascoe, 1859

Species of beetle

Ropica varipennis is a species of beetle in the family Cerambycidae. It was described by Pascoe in 1859.
