= Ropica fruhstorferi =

Scientific classification
- Kingdom: Animalia
- Phylum: Arthropoda
- Class: Insecta
- Order: Coleoptera
- Suborder: Polyphaga
- Infraorder: Cucujiformia
- Family: Cerambycidae
- Genus: Ropica
- Species: R. fruhstorferi

Binomial name
- Ropica fruhstorferi Breuning, 1961

Species of beetle

Ropica fruhstorferi is a species of beetle in the family Cerambycidae. It was described by Breuning in 1961.
