= Ropica unifuscomaculata =

Scientific classification
- Kingdom: Animalia
- Phylum: Arthropoda
- Class: Insecta
- Order: Coleoptera
- Suborder: Polyphaga
- Infraorder: Cucujiformia
- Family: Cerambycidae
- Genus: Ropica
- Species: R. unifuscomaculata

Binomial name
- Ropica unifuscomaculata Breuning, 1974

Species of beetle

Ropica unifuscomaculata is a species of beetle in the family Cerambycidae. It was described by Stephan von Breuning in 1974.
