= Ropica albomaculata =

Scientific classification
- Kingdom: Animalia
- Phylum: Arthropoda
- Class: Insecta
- Order: Coleoptera
- Suborder: Polyphaga
- Infraorder: Cucujiformia
- Family: Cerambycidae
- Genus: Ropica
- Species: R. albomaculata

Binomial name
- Ropica albomaculata Pic, 1945

Species of beetle in the family Cerambycidae

Ropica albomaculata is a species of beetle in the family Cerambycidae. It was first described by Maurice Pic in 1945 in Vietnam.
