= Ropica formosana =

Scientific classification
- Domain: Eukaryota
- Kingdom: Animalia
- Phylum: Arthropoda
- Class: Insecta
- Order: Coleoptera
- Suborder: Polyphaga
- Infraorder: Cucujiformia
- Family: Cerambycidae
- Genus: Ropica
- Species: R. formosana

Binomial name
- Ropica formosana Bates, 1866

Synonyms
- Ropica japonica Hayashi, 1972; Ropica japonica amamiana (B. Makihara, 1995); Ropica japonica japonica Hayashi, 1972; Ropica nobuoi Breuning & Ohbayashi, 1964; Ropica japonica tokarana Takakuwa, 1984

Species of beetle

Ropica formosana is a species of beetle in the family Cerambycidae. It was described by Henry Walter Bates in 1866. It contains four subspecies, Ropica formosana formosana, Ropica formosana japonica, Ropica formosana nobuoi, and Ropica formosana tokaraensis.
