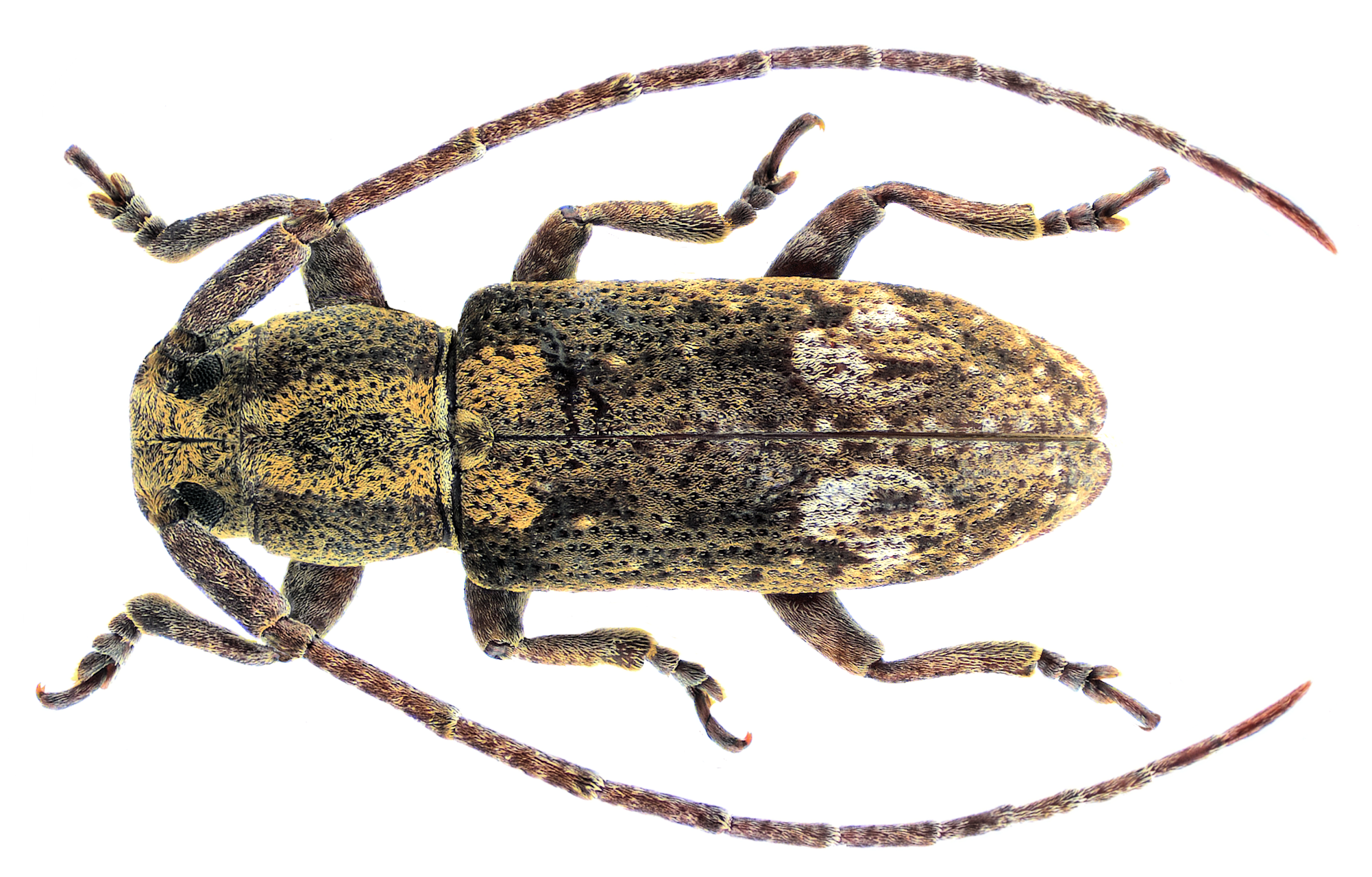

Scientific classification
- Kingdom: Animalia
- Phylum: Arthropoda
- Class: Insecta
- Order: Coleoptera
- Suborder: Polyphaga
- Infraorder: Cucujiformia
- Family: Cerambycidae
- Genus: Ropica
- Species: R. rufonotata

Binomial name
- Ropica rufonotata Pic, 1926

= Ropica rufonotata =

Species of beetle

Ropica rufonotata is a species of beetle in the family Cerambycidae. It was described by Maurice Pic in 1926.
