= Ropica strandi =

Scientific classification
- Kingdom: Animalia
- Phylum: Arthropoda
- Class: Insecta
- Order: Coleoptera
- Suborder: Polyphaga
- Infraorder: Cucujiformia
- Family: Cerambycidae
- Genus: Ropica
- Species: R. strandi

Binomial name
- Ropica strandi Breuning, 1942

Species of beetle

Ropica strandi is a species of beetle in the family Cerambycidae. It was described by Breuning in 1942.
