= Ropica coreana =

Scientific classification
- Kingdom: Animalia
- Phylum: Arthropoda
- Class: Insecta
- Order: Coleoptera
- Suborder: Polyphaga
- Infraorder: Cucujiformia
- Family: Cerambycidae
- Genus: Ropica
- Species: R. coreana

Binomial name
- Ropica coreana Breuning

Species of beetle

Ropica coreana is a species of beetle in the family Cerambycidae. It was described by Stephan von Breuning.
