= Ropica ochreomaculata =

Scientific classification
- Kingdom: Animalia
- Phylum: Arthropoda
- Class: Insecta
- Order: Coleoptera
- Suborder: Polyphaga
- Infraorder: Cucujiformia
- Family: Cerambycidae
- Genus: Ropica
- Species: R. ochreomaculata

Binomial name
- Ropica ochreomaculata Breuning, 1969

Species of beetle

Ropica ochreomaculata is a species of beetle in the family Cerambycidae. It was described by Breuning in 1969. It is known from Borneo.
