= Ropica coomani =

Scientific classification
- Kingdom: Animalia
- Phylum: Arthropoda
- Class: Insecta
- Order: Coleoptera
- Suborder: Polyphaga
- Infraorder: Cucujiformia
- Family: Cerambycidae
- Genus: Ropica
- Species: R. coomani

Binomial name
- Ropica coomani Pic, 1926

Species of beetle

Ropica coomani is a species of beetle in the family Cerambycidae. It was described by Maurice Pic in 1926.
