= Ropica indica =

Scientific classification
- Kingdom: Animalia
- Phylum: Arthropoda
- Class: Insecta
- Order: Coleoptera
- Suborder: Polyphaga
- Infraorder: Cucujiformia
- Family: Cerambycidae
- Genus: Ropica
- Species: R. indica

Binomial name
- Ropica indica Breuning, 1939

Species of beetle

Ropica indica is a species of beetle in the family Cerambycidae. A description was made by Breuning in 1939.
