= Ropica dissonans =

Scientific classification
- Domain: Eukaryota
- Kingdom: Animalia
- Phylum: Arthropoda
- Class: Insecta
- Order: Coleoptera
- Suborder: Polyphaga
- Infraorder: Cucujiformia
- Family: Cerambycidae
- Genus: Ropica
- Species: R. dissonans

Binomial name
- Ropica dissonans Gahan, 1907

Species of beetle

Ropica dissonans is a species of beetle in the family Cerambycidae. It was described by Gahan in 1907.
