= Ropica kasaiensis =

Scientific classification
- Kingdom: Animalia
- Phylum: Arthropoda
- Class: Insecta
- Order: Coleoptera
- Suborder: Polyphaga
- Infraorder: Cucujiformia
- Family: Cerambycidae
- Genus: Ropica
- Species: R. kasaiensis

Binomial name
- Ropica kasaiensis Breuning, 1948

Synonyms
- Pterolophia allardi Breuning, 1970

Species of beetle

Ropica kasaiensis is a species of beetle in the family Cerambycidae. It was described by Breuning in 1948.
