= Ropica ghanaensis =

Scientific classification
- Kingdom: Animalia
- Phylum: Arthropoda
- Class: Insecta
- Order: Coleoptera
- Suborder: Polyphaga
- Infraorder: Cucujiformia
- Family: Cerambycidae
- Genus: Ropica
- Species: R. ghanaensis

Binomial name
- Ropica ghanaensis Breuning, 1978

Species of beetle

Ropica ghanaensis is a species of beetle in the family Cerambycidae. It was described by Breuning in 1978.
