= Ropica fouqueti =

Scientific classification
- Kingdom: Animalia
- Phylum: Arthropoda
- Class: Insecta
- Order: Coleoptera
- Suborder: Polyphaga
- Infraorder: Cucujiformia
- Family: Cerambycidae
- Genus: Ropica
- Species: R. fouqueti

Binomial name
- Ropica fouqueti Pic, 1938

Species of beetle

Ropica fouqueti is a species of beetle in the family Cerambycidae. It was described by Maurice Pic in 1938.
