= Ropica vietnamensis =

Scientific classification
- Kingdom: Animalia
- Phylum: Arthropoda
- Class: Insecta
- Order: Coleoptera
- Suborder: Polyphaga
- Infraorder: Cucujiformia
- Family: Cerambycidae
- Genus: Ropica
- Species: R. vietnamensis

Binomial name
- Ropica vietnamensis Breuning, 1972

Species of beetle

Ropica vietnamensis is a species of beetle in the family Cerambycidae. It was described by Breuning in 1972.
