= Ropica carinipennis =

Scientific classification
- Kingdom: Animalia
- Phylum: Arthropoda
- Class: Insecta
- Order: Coleoptera
- Suborder: Polyphaga
- Infraorder: Cucujiformia
- Family: Cerambycidae
- Genus: Ropica
- Species: R. carinipennis

Binomial name
- Ropica carinipennis Breuning, 1954

Species of beetle

Ropica carinipennis is a species of beetle in the family Cerambycidae. It was first described by Stephan von Breuning in 1954.
