= Ropica nigroscutellaris =

Scientific classification
- Kingdom: Animalia
- Phylum: Arthropoda
- Class: Insecta
- Order: Coleoptera
- Suborder: Polyphaga
- Infraorder: Cucujiformia
- Family: Cerambycidae
- Genus: Ropica
- Species: R. nigroscutellaris

Binomial name
- Ropica nigroscutellaris (Breuning, 1943)

Species of beetle

Ropica nigroscutellaris is a species of beetle in the family Cerambycidae. It was described by Breuning in 1943.
