= Ropica palauana =

Scientific classification
- Domain: Eukaryota
- Kingdom: Animalia
- Phylum: Arthropoda
- Class: Insecta
- Order: Coleoptera
- Suborder: Polyphaga
- Infraorder: Cucujiformia
- Family: Cerambycidae
- Genus: Ropica
- Species: R. palauana

Binomial name
- Ropica palauana (Matsushita, 1935)

Species of beetle

Ropica palauana is a species of beetle in the family Cerambycidae. It was described by Matsushita in 1935.
