= Ropica philippinensis =

Scientific classification
- Kingdom: Animalia
- Phylum: Arthropoda
- Class: Insecta
- Order: Coleoptera
- Suborder: Polyphaga
- Infraorder: Cucujiformia
- Family: Cerambycidae
- Genus: Ropica
- Species: R. philippinensis

Binomial name
- Ropica philippinensis Breuning, 1939

Species of beetle

Ropica philippinensis is a species of beetle in the family Cerambycidae. It was described by Breuning in 1939.
