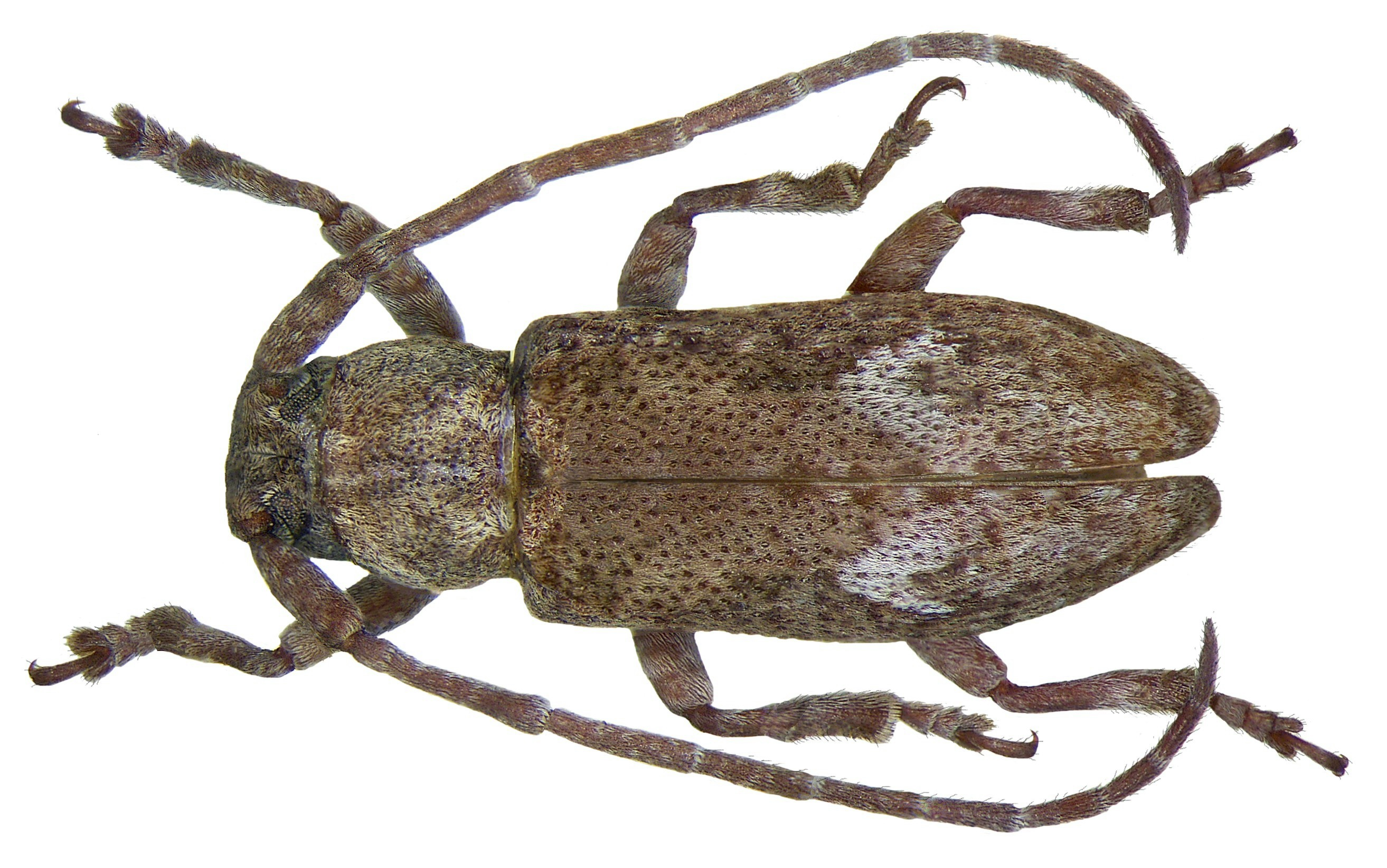

Scientific classification
- Kingdom: Animalia
- Phylum: Arthropoda
- Clade: Pancrustacea
- Class: Insecta
- Order: Coleoptera
- Suborder: Polyphaga
- Infraorder: Cucujiformia
- Family: Cerambycidae
- Genus: Ropica
- Species: R. honesta

Binomial name
- Ropica honesta Pascoe, 1865

Synonyms
- Ropica burketi Gressitt, 1937; Ropica dorsalis ? Schwarzer, 1925; Ropica langana Pic, 1945; Ropica rufescens Pic, 1926

= Ropica honesta =

Species of beetle

Ropica honesta is a species of beetle in the family Cerambycidae. It was described by Francis Polkinghorne Pascoe in 1865. It is known from Borneo, Sumatra, Java, New Guinea, the Philippines, and China.
