= Ropica signata =

Scientific classification
- Kingdom: Animalia
- Phylum: Arthropoda
- Clade: Pancrustacea
- Class: Insecta
- Order: Coleoptera
- Suborder: Polyphaga
- Infraorder: Cucujiformia
- Family: Cerambycidae
- Genus: Ropica
- Species: R. signata

Binomial name
- Ropica signata Pic, 1932

Species of beetle

Ropica signata is a species of beetle in the family Cerambycidae. It was described by Maurice Pic in 1932.
