= Ropica variegata =

Scientific classification
- Kingdom: Animalia
- Phylum: Arthropoda
- Clade: Pancrustacea
- Class: Insecta
- Order: Coleoptera
- Suborder: Polyphaga
- Infraorder: Cucujiformia
- Family: Cerambycidae
- Genus: Ropica
- Species: R. variegata

Binomial name
- Ropica variegata Fisher, 1925

Species of beetle

Ropica variegata is a species of beetle in the family Cerambycidae. It was described by Fisher in 1925.
