= Capnolymma cingalensis =

Scientific classification
- Domain: Eukaryota
- Kingdom: Animalia
- Phylum: Arthropoda
- Class: Insecta
- Order: Coleoptera
- Suborder: Polyphaga
- Infraorder: Cucujiformia
- Family: Cerambycidae
- Genus: Capnolymma
- Species: C. cingalensis

Binomial name
- Capnolymma cingalensis Gahan, 1906

Species of beetle

Capnolymma cingalensis is a species of beetle in the family Cerambycidae. It was described by Gahan in 1906.
