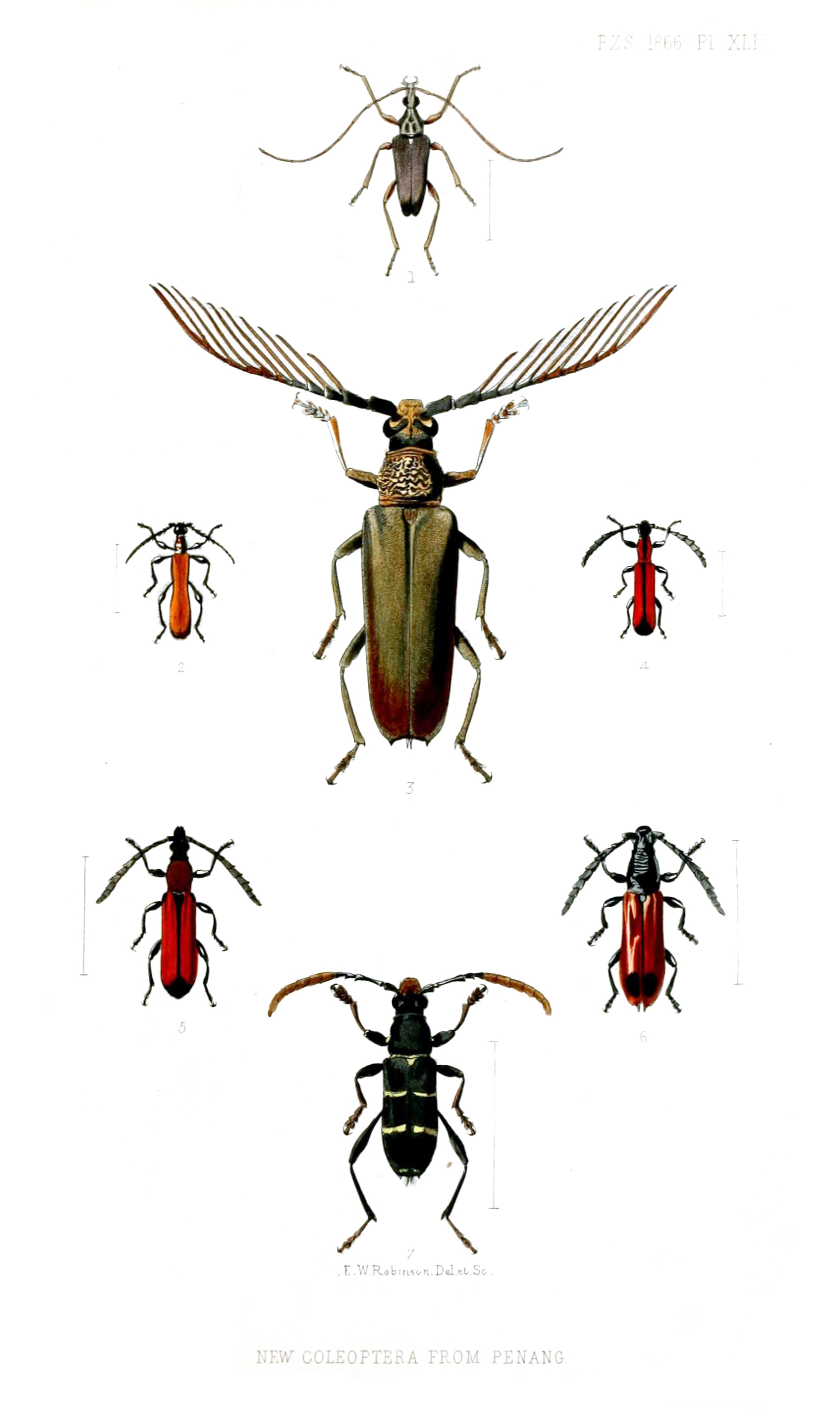
- Capnolymma capreola at the top of an illustration of several longhorn beetles from Penang, Malaysia drawn by E.W. Robinson in 1866

Scientific classification
- Domain: Eukaryota
- Kingdom: Animalia
- Phylum: Arthropoda
- Class: Insecta
- Order: Coleoptera
- Suborder: Polyphaga
- Infraorder: Cucujiformia
- Family: Cerambycidae
- Genus: Capnolymma
- Species: C. capreola

Binomial name
- Capnolymma capreola Pascoe, 1866

= Capnolymma capreola =

Species of beetle

Capnolymma capreola is a species of beetle in the family Cerambycidae. It was described by Pascoe in 1866.
