= Capnolymma ohbayashii =

Scientific classification
- Domain: Eukaryota
- Kingdom: Animalia
- Phylum: Arthropoda
- Class: Insecta
- Order: Coleoptera
- Suborder: Polyphaga
- Infraorder: Cucujiformia
- Family: Cerambycidae
- Genus: Capnolymma
- Species: C. ohbayashii

Binomial name
- Capnolymma ohbayashii Holzschuh, 2006

Species of beetle

Capnolymma ohbayashii is a species of beetle in the family Cerambycidae. It was described by Holzschuh in 2006.
