= Capnolymma ishiharai =

Scientific classification
- Domain: Eukaryota
- Kingdom: Animalia
- Phylum: Arthropoda
- Class: Insecta
- Order: Coleoptera
- Suborder: Polyphaga
- Infraorder: Cucujiformia
- Family: Cerambycidae
- Genus: Capnolymma
- Species: C. ishiharai

Binomial name
- Capnolymma ishiharai Ohbayashi, 1994

Species of beetle

Capnolymma ishiharai is a species of beetle in the family Cerambycidae. It was described by Ohbayashi in 1994.
