= Capnolymma laotica =

Scientific classification
- Domain: Eukaryota
- Kingdom: Animalia
- Phylum: Arthropoda
- Class: Insecta
- Order: Coleoptera
- Suborder: Polyphaga
- Infraorder: Cucujiformia
- Family: Cerambycidae
- Genus: Capnolymma
- Species: C. laotica

Binomial name
- Capnolymma laotica Gressitt & Rondon, 1970

Species of beetle

Capnolymma laotica is a species of beetle in the family Cerambycidae. It was described by sv:Judson Linsley Gressitt and Rondon in 1970.
