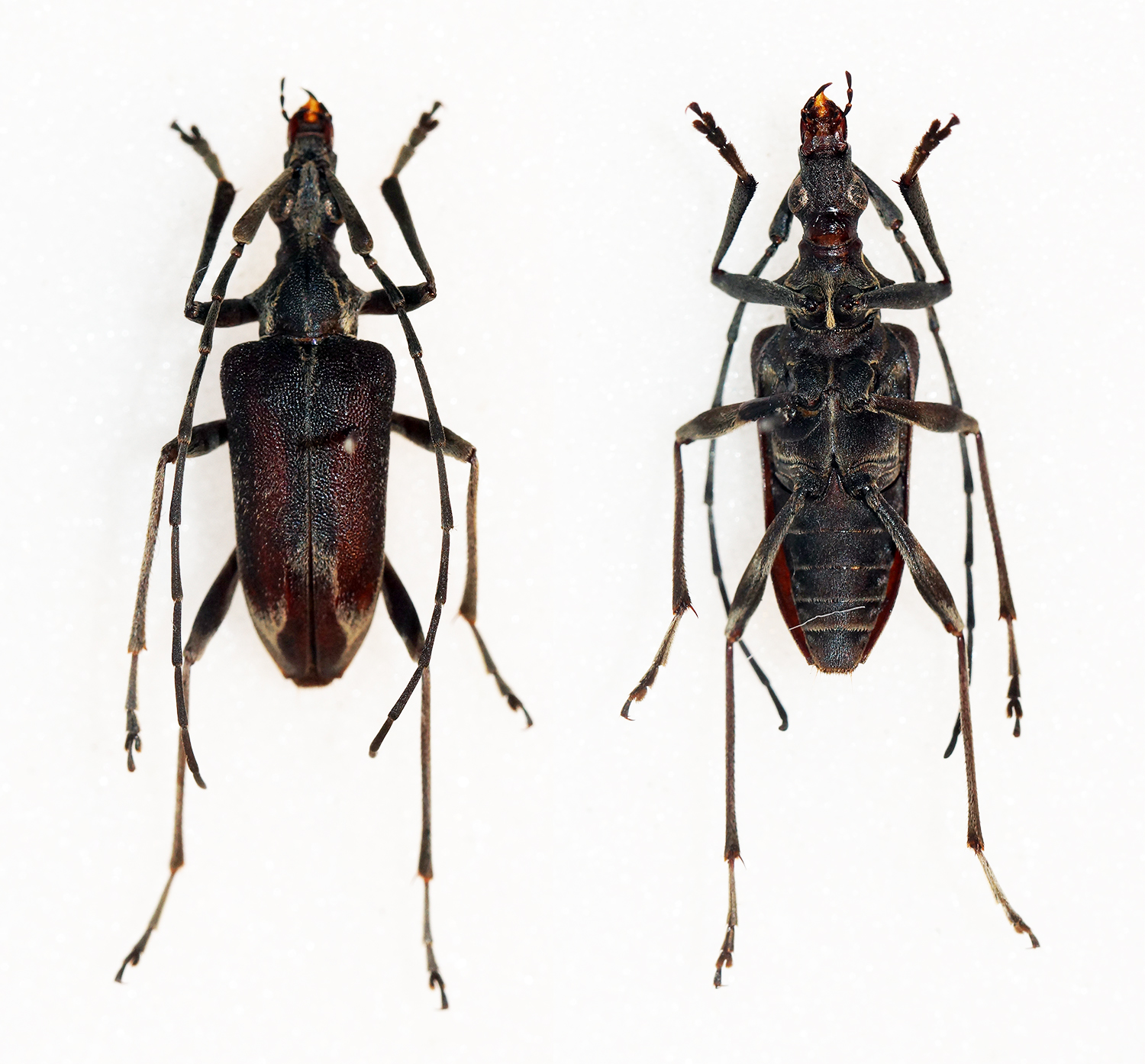
- Capnolymma brunnea

Scientific classification
- Domain: Eukaryota
- Kingdom: Animalia
- Phylum: Arthropoda
- Class: Insecta
- Order: Coleoptera
- Suborder: Polyphaga
- Infraorder: Cucujiformia
- Family: Cerambycidae
- Genus: Capnolymma

= Capnolymma =

Genus of beetles

Capnolymma is a genus of beetles in the family Cerambycidae, containing the following species:

- Capnolymma borneana Ohbayashi, 1994
- Capnolymma brunnea Gressitt & Rondon, 1970
- Capnolymma capreola Pascoe, 1866
- Capnolymma cingalensis Gahan, 1906
- Capnolymma ishiharai Ohbayashi, 1994
- Capnolymma laotica Gressitt & Rondon, 1970
- Capnolymma ohbayashii Holzschuh, 2006
- Capnolymma similis Gressitt & Rondon, 1970
- Capnolymma stygia Pascoe, 1858
