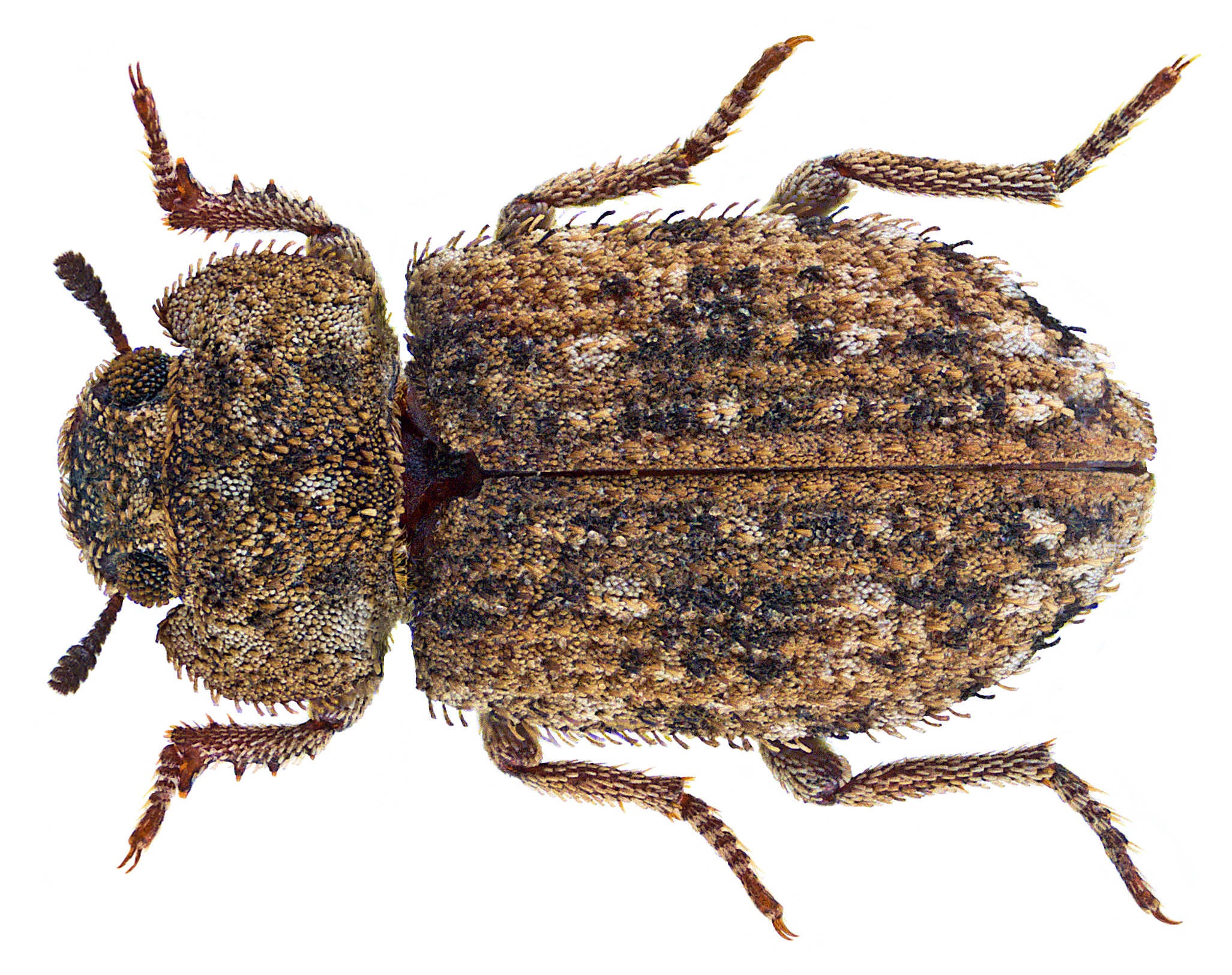

Scientific classification
- Kingdom: Animalia
- Phylum: Arthropoda
- Clade: Pancrustacea
- Class: Insecta
- Order: Coleoptera
- Suborder: Polyphaga
- Infraorder: Cucujiformia
- Family: Tenebrionidae
- Genus: Leichenum
- Species: L. canaliculatum

Binomial name
- Leichenum canaliculatum (Fabricius 1798)

Synonyms
- Opatrum canaliculatum Fabricius, 1798; Opatrum canaliculatum variegatum Klug, 1833; Leichenum pulchellum Küster, 1849; Leichenum variegatum Küster, 1849; Leichenum argillaceum Motschulsky, 1863; Lichenum foveistrium Marseul, 1876; Lichenum seriehispidum Marseul, 1876; Lichenum gebieni Reitter, 1906; Endothina squamosa Carter, 1924

= Leichenum canaliculatum =

Species of beetle

Leichenum canaliculatum, commonly known as Madagascar beetle, is a species of darkling beetle.

== Distribution ==
The species can be found in several Africa, Asian and Oceania countries including: Australia, Botswana, Cameroon, Chad, Cuba, France, Gambia, Guadeloupe, India, Italy, Japan, Kenya, Liberia, Mozambique, Namibia, Niger, Nigeria, Senegal, Somalia, South Africa, Spain, Sri Lanka, Sudan, Tanzania, Thailand, and Vietnam. It is also introduced to USA and can be found in many coastal areas.

== Description ==
Adult is oval with an average length of 5 mm. The body is grayish with black, gray, brown mottling. A whitish spatula-shaped, scaly setae present. Eyes are globose and slightly emarginated. Antennae short with a clearly defined 4-segmented club on the apical half. The length of the mature larva is 12 mm. In the pupa, the urogomphi are fused into a long spine-like process and the tip ends in two small round lobes. Pupa is about 6 mm in length.

== Biology ==
Adults are easily attracted to light traps as well as both baited or unbaited pitfall traps. It is commonly found in sandy areas, along beaches, lakes and river shorelines. The highest aggregations are recorded from March to November. Adults usually hide under small piles of leaf litter in sand depressions. Both adults and larvae are known to feed on roots of Bermuda grass, cotton, turnips and rutabagas. Larva also observed to feed on nap of rugs, and associated with damaged peach trees and Amaryllis bulbs.
