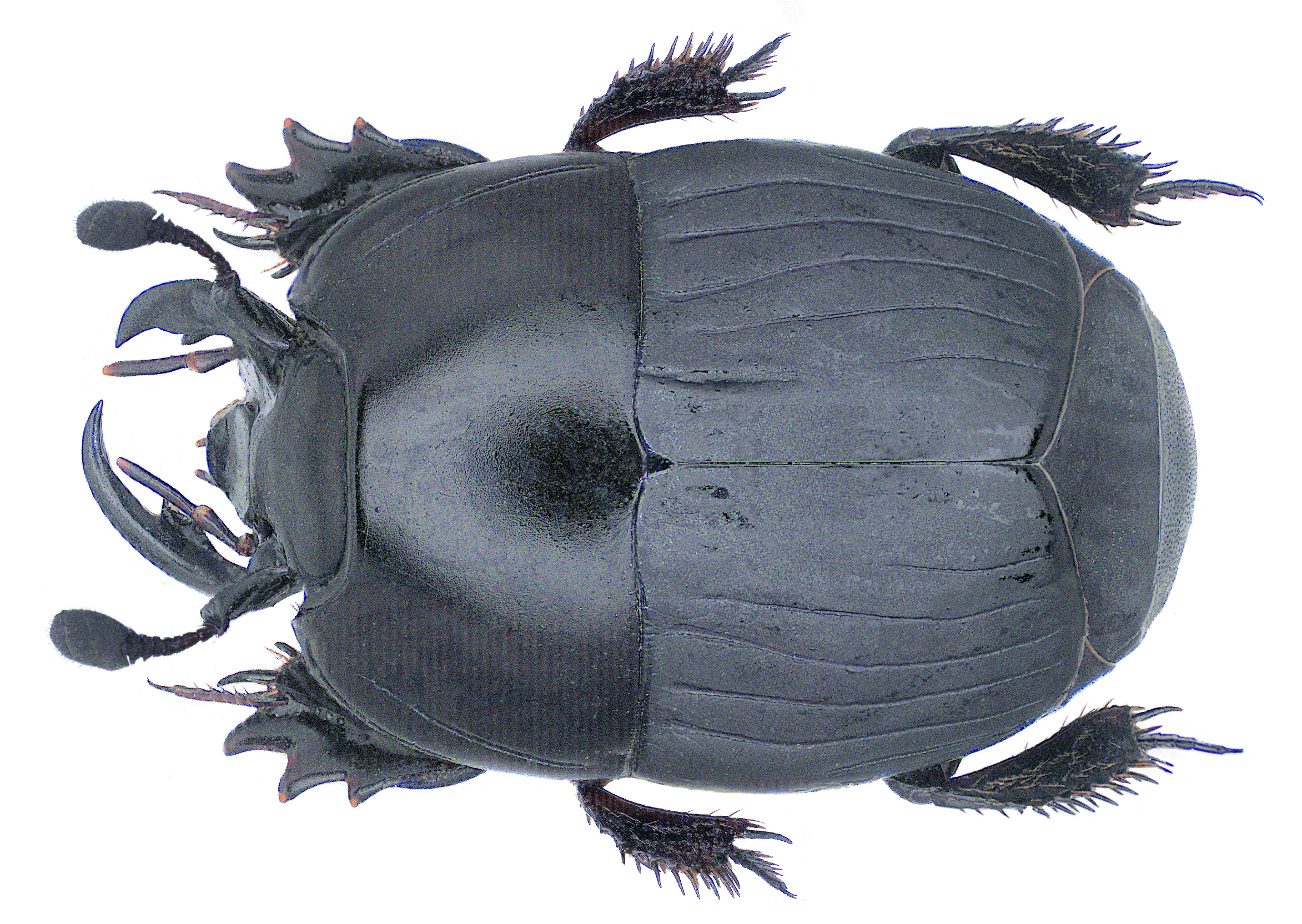

Scientific classification
- Kingdom: Animalia
- Phylum: Arthropoda
- Clade: Pancrustacea
- Class: Insecta
- Order: Coleoptera
- Suborder: Polyphaga
- Infraorder: Staphyliniformia
- Family: Histeridae
- Genus: Nasaltus
- Species: N. chinensis

Binomial name
- Nasaltus chinensis (Quensel ex Schönherr, 1806)

Synonyms
- Hister chinensis Quensel, 1806; Pachylister chinensis Kim et al, 1994

= Nasaltus chinensis =

Species of beetle

Nasaltus chinensis is a species of clown beetle found in India, Sri Lanka, Pakistan and Australia.
