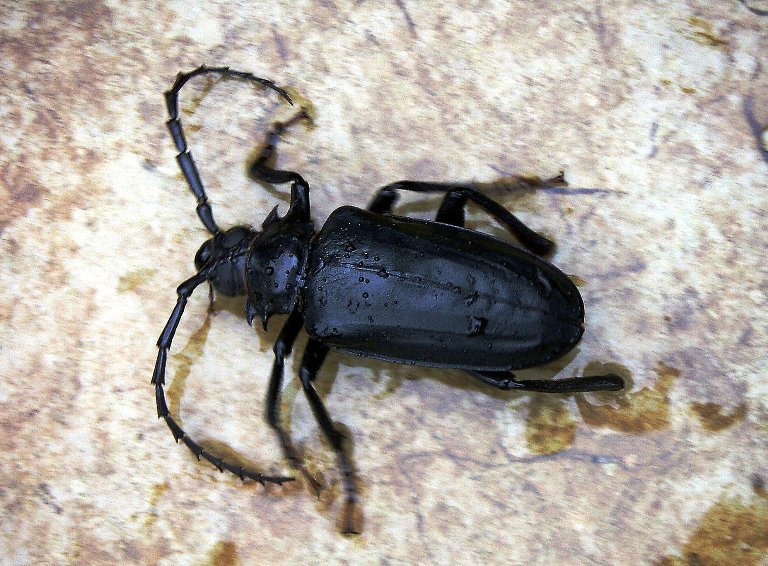

Scientific classification
- Kingdom: Animalia
- Phylum: Arthropoda
- Clade: Pancrustacea
- Class: Insecta
- Order: Coleoptera
- Suborder: Polyphaga
- Infraorder: Cucujiformia
- Family: Cerambycidae
- Genus: Prionomma
- Species: P. atratum

Binomial name
- Prionomma atratum (Gmelin, 1789)

Synonyms
- Prionus atratum Gmelin, 1789; Prionus orientalis Olivier, 1795; Prionus tranquebaricus Fabricius, 1798; Prionus buphtalmus Fabricius, 1801; Armiger hussarus ceilonensis Voet, 1806; Prionoma orientalis White, 1853; Prionomma atratum Gahan, 1906; Prionoma (Prionomma) atratum Lameere, 1910; Prionomma atratum Quentin & Villiers, 1981

= Prionomma atratum =

Species of beetle

Prionomma atratum is a species of longhorn beetle native to Sri Lanka and India.
