= Harmatelia bilinea =

Scientific classification
- Kingdom: Animalia
- Phylum: Arthropoda
- Class: Insecta
- Order: Coleoptera
- Suborder: Polyphaga
- Infraorder: Elateriformia
- Family: Lampyridae
- Genus: Harmatelia
- Species: H. bilinea

Binomial name
- Harmatelia bilinea Walker, 1858

Species of beetle

Harmatelia bilinea is a species of firefly beetle endemic to Sri Lanka.

== Description ==
Body length is 6.0 to 6.2 mm. Pronotum is 1.15 mm long. Pronotum very convex without flat lateral or anterior borders. Lateral and fore edges of pronotum are slightly reflexed with a straight base. Dorsum dark brown which becomes lighter medially forward. Scutellum triangular and not trapezoidal and is dark yellow, hairy. Mesonotal plates are broad, and dull yellow. In head, frons and mouthparts are projected forward, giving a shape of a short beak. Pronotum bent downward Frons dark brown between antennal sockets. Vertex blackish and slightly concave medially. Antennal sockets are large, and yellowish. Clypeus yellow and short and clothed with a few stiff setae. Mandibles small, and semicircular. Maxillary and labial palpi are short. Eyes small, distant and protuberant. Antennae with 11 antennomeres and a narrowly remiform ramus. Antaennae are generally dark reddish brown to black. Elytra 5.1 mm long which are subparallel, and color varying from dark brown, with a pale yellow oblique vitta. Elytral striae rugose, with a fine granulation. Thoracic sterna and ventral abdominal segments are yellowish whereas tergites are reddish brown with yellow lateral borders. Legs are long and yellow.
