= Decellebruchus walkeri =

Scientific classification
- Missing taxonomy template (fix): Decellebruchus
- Species: Template:Taxonomy/DecellebruchusD. walkeri

Binomial name
- Template:Taxonomy/DecellebruchusDecellebruchus walkeri (Pic, 1912)

Synonyms
- Bruchus figuratus Walker, 1859; Bruchus walkeri Pic, 1912; Bruchidius walkeri Decelle 1975; Spermophagus figuratus Motschulsky 1863

Species of beetle

Decellebruchus walkeri is a species of leaf beetle found in India, Kenya, Sri Lanka and Thailand.

== Description ==
Body length of male is about 1.77 to 2.1 mm. The first five segments of the antennae and the apex are yellowish, whereas other antennal segments are dark. The body is dark in color. The legs, part of elytra and femoral ventrum are yellowish to dark. The body is clothed with blackish, yellowish and whitish pubescence. The pygidium has three basal white pubescent spots. The head is short and broad. The prothorax is sub-conical and lacks a lateral carina. The pronotal disc is convex, whereas the prosternal process is triangular in shape. The scutellum is squarish. The pygidium is vertical. The last abdominal sternite is emarginate. The body length of female is about 1.95 to 2.8 mm and features are very similar to the male, but with a serrate, subvertical pygidium and the last abdominal sternite is not marginate.
