= Epicalus virgatus =

Scientific classification
- Kingdom: Animalia
- Phylum: Arthropoda
- Class: Insecta
- Order: Coleoptera
- Suborder: Polyphaga
- Infraorder: Cucujiformia
- Family: Curculionidae
- Genus: Epicalus
- Species: E. virgatus

Binomial name
- Epicalus virgatus Motschulsky, 1858

Species of beetle

Epicalus virgatus, is a species of weevil found in Sri Lanka and Myanmar.

== Description ==
This species has a body length is about 2.75 mm. Body piceous. Head and rostrum with green scales. Prothorax with a broad light broad dorsal stripe, which edged with a narrow dark brown stripe. Lateral sides and ventral surface is pale metallic green. Elytra with similar coloured. Head with a faint central stria. Rostrum as long as the head. Antennae reddish brown, where the scape covered with short erect setae. Prothorax subcylindrical with very slightly rounded sides. Elytra separately rounded at the base. Elytral stria distinctly punctate. Legs light reddish brown.
