= Cratopus sinhalensis =

Scientific classification
- Kingdom: Animalia
- Phylum: Arthropoda
- Class: Insecta
- Order: Coleoptera
- Suborder: Polyphaga
- Infraorder: Cucujiformia
- Family: Curculionidae
- Genus: Cratopus
- Species: C. sinhalensis

Binomial name
- Cratopus sinhalensis Marshall, 1916

Species of beetle

Cratopus sinhalensis is a species of weevil found in Sri Lanka.

== Description ==
This species has a body length is about 9 mm. Body black, evenly and thinly clothed with short pale hair-like scales with a coppery tinge. Head coarsely punctate. Eyes are moderately convex. Rostrum long and broad. Antennae brown. Prothorax with strongly rounded sides, and truncate and distinctly marginate base. Scutellurn with sparse hair-like scales. Elytra broadly ovate in female with very oblique shoulders. Legs black, and tarsi piceous. Femora smooth, coriaceous and tibiae rugosely punctate.
