= Ptochus pyriformis =

Scientific classification
- Kingdom: Animalia
- Phylum: Arthropoda
- Class: Insecta
- Order: Coleoptera
- Suborder: Polyphaga
- Infraorder: Cucujiformia
- Family: Curculionidae
- Genus: Ptochus
- Species: P. pyriformis

Binomial name
- Ptochus pyriformis Marshall, 1916

Species of beetle

Ptochus pyriformis is a species of weevil found in Sri Lanka.

== Description ==
This species has a body length is about 3.75 mm. Body pyriform and piceous in color, with uniform dense grey scales. Eyes are subdorsal and moderately convex. Forehead broadly impressed. Rostrum rather broader than long. Antennae ferruginous. Prothorax broader than long, with much narrower apex, whereas the basal margin is shallowly bisinuate. Scutellum distinct and small. Elytra pear-shaped. Elytral striae are shallow punctate and without scales.
