= Erymus gracilis =

Scientific classification
- Kingdom: Animalia
- Phylum: Arthropoda
- Class: Insecta
- Order: Coleoptera
- Suborder: Polyphaga
- Infraorder: Staphyliniformia
- Family: Staphylinidae
- Genus: Erymus
- Species: E. gracilis

Binomial name
- Erymus gracilis (Fauvel, 1895)

Synonyms
- Leptacinus gracilis Fauvel, 1895; Leptacinus circumcaspicus Gusarov, 1993; Leptacinus nilamburensis Cameron, 1932; Leptacinus notabilis Cameron, 1926

Species of beetle

Erymus gracilis is a species of rove beetle widely spread in Oriental region. It is found throughout China, Sri Lanka, India, Bhutan, Thailand, Malaysia, Laos, Indonesia, Myanmar, and Nepal.

== Description ==
Maximum body length is about 4.08 mm.
