= Ptochus planoculis =

Scientific classification
- Kingdom: Animalia
- Phylum: Arthropoda
- Class: Insecta
- Order: Coleoptera
- Suborder: Polyphaga
- Infraorder: Cucujiformia
- Family: Curculionidae
- Genus: Ptochus
- Species: P. planoculis

Binomial name
- Ptochus planoculis Marshall, 1944

Synonyms
- Baryrrhinus planoculis Marshall, 1944

Species of beetle

Ptochus planoculis is a species of weevil found in Sri Lanka.

== Description ==
This species has a body length is about 3 mm. Body black, with uniform light brown scales. Eyes subdorsal and almost plane. Rostrum broader than long with dilated genae. Antennae piceous. Prothorax transverse. Scutelluln distinct. Elytra broadly ovate with truncate base.
