= Amphorygma ceylonensis =

Scientific classification
- Kingdom: Animalia
- Phylum: Arthropoda
- Class: Insecta
- Order: Coleoptera
- Suborder: Polyphaga
- Infraorder: Cucujiformia
- Family: Curculionidae
- Genus: Amphorygma
- Species: A. ceylonensis

Binomial name
- Amphorygma ceylonensis Marshall, 1916

Species of beetle

Amphorygma ceylonensis is a species of weevil found in Sri Lanka.

== Description ==
This species has a body length is about 2.5 mm. Body black, with dense brownish grey scales. Forehead more convex. Rostrum distinctly broader than long. Antennae with longer and more slender funicle as well as pointed club. Prothorax broader than long, with more strongly rounded sides. Elytra much less rounded at the base, and almost truncate.
