= Ficicis despectus =

Scientific classification
- Kingdom: Animalia
- Phylum: Arthropoda
- Clade: Pancrustacea
- Class: Insecta
- Order: Coleoptera
- Suborder: Polyphaga
- Infraorder: Cucujiformia
- Family: Curculionidae
- Genus: Ficicis
- Species: F. despectus

Binomial name
- Ficicis despectus (Walker, 1859)

Synonyms
- Hylesinus despectus Walker, 1859; Ficicis despectus (Walker): Wood 199; Hylesinus samoanus Schedl, 1951

Species of beetle

Ficicis despectus is a species of weevil native to Oriental region and eastwards to New Guinea, Australia and the Solomon Islands.
