= Zoodes maculatus =

Scientific classification
- Kingdom: Animalia
- Phylum: Arthropoda
- Class: Insecta
- Order: Coleoptera
- Suborder: Polyphaga
- Infraorder: Cucujiformia
- Family: Cerambycidae
- Genus: Zoodes
- Species: Z. maculatus

Binomial name
- Zoodes maculatus (White, 1855)

Synonyms
- Falsoplatocera theresae Pic, 1947; Stromatium? maculatum White, 1855; Zoodes maculatus Lacordaire, 1869

Species of beetle

Zoodes maculatus is a species of longhorn beetle native to Sri Lanka and India.
