= Drasterius sulcatulus =

Scientific classification
- Kingdom: Animalia
- Phylum: Arthropoda
- Class: Insecta
- Order: Coleoptera
- Suborder: Polyphaga
- Infraorder: Elateriformia
- Family: Elateridae
- Genus: Drasterius
- Species: D. sulcatulus

Binomial name
- Drasterius sulcatulus Candèze, 1859

Species of beetle

Drasterius sulcatulus is a species of click beetle found in India, Nepal, Pakistan, Sri Lanka, UAE and Oman.

It is about 4.2 mm in length. Apex of the posterior angles of pronotum is less sharp and not divergent.
