= Strattis srilankaiensis =

Scientific classification
- Kingdom: Animalia
- Phylum: Arthropoda
- Clade: Pancrustacea
- Class: Insecta
- Order: Coleoptera
- Suborder: Polyphaga
- Infraorder: Cucujiformia
- Family: Curculionidae
- Genus: Strattis
- Species: S. srilankaiensis

Binomial name
- Strattis srilankaiensis Devi, Ray & Ramamurthy, 2016

Species of beetle

Strattis srilankaiensis is a species of weevil found in Sri Lanka.

== Description ==
Body length is about 4.42 to 6.73 mm.
