= Crossotarsus saundersi =

Scientific classification
- Kingdom: Animalia
- Phylum: Arthropoda
- Clade: Pancrustacea
- Class: Insecta
- Order: Coleoptera
- Suborder: Polyphaga
- Infraorder: Cucujiformia
- Family: Curculionidae
- Genus: Crossotarsus
- Species: C. saundersi

Binomial name
- Crossotarsus saundersi Chapuis, 1865

Species of beetle

Crossotarsus saundersi is a species of weevil found in Sri Lanka, Australia and New Zealand.

== Description ==
It is most abundant during the autumn and the spring.
