= Pentoxydema rostralis =

Scientific classification
- Kingdom: Animalia
- Phylum: Arthropoda
- Clade: Pancrustacea
- Class: Insecta
- Order: Coleoptera
- Suborder: Polyphaga
- Infraorder: Cucujiformia
- Family: Curculionidae
- Genus: Pentoxydema
- Species: P. rostralis

Binomial name
- Pentoxydema rostralis Marshall, 1938

Species of beetle

Pentoxydema rostralis is a species of weevil found in Sri Lanka.

== Description ==
Typical length of the adult is about 7 to 8 mm.
