= Strattis biguttatus =

Scientific classification
- Kingdom: Animalia
- Phylum: Arthropoda
- Clade: Pancrustacea
- Class: Insecta
- Order: Coleoptera
- Suborder: Polyphaga
- Infraorder: Cucujiformia
- Superfamily: Curculionoidea
- Family: Curculionidae
- Genus: Strattis
- Species: S. biguttatus

Binomial name
- Strattis biguttatus Pascoe, 1883

Species of beetle

Strattis biguttatus is a species of weevil found in the Indian subcontinent.
