= Craniodicticus mucronatus =

Scientific classification
- Kingdom: Animalia
- Phylum: Arthropoda
- Clade: Pancrustacea
- Class: Insecta
- Order: Coleoptera
- Suborder: Polyphaga
- Infraorder: Cucujiformia
- Family: Curculionidae
- Genus: Craniodicticus
- Species: C. mucronatus

Binomial name
- Craniodicticus mucronatus Blandford, 1895

Species of beetle

Craniodicticus mucronatus is a species of weevil endemic to Sri Lanka.
