= Ortalia horni =

Scientific classification
- Kingdom: Animalia
- Phylum: Arthropoda
- Clade: Pancrustacea
- Class: Insecta
- Order: Coleoptera
- Suborder: Polyphaga
- Infraorder: Cucujiformia
- Family: Coccinellidae
- Genus: Ortalia
- Species: O. horni

Binomial name
- Ortalia horni Weise, 1900

Species of beetle

Ortalia horni is a species of lady beetle native to India and Sri Lanka.
