= Thranius gibbosus =

Scientific classification
- Kingdom: Animalia
- Phylum: Arthropoda
- Class: Insecta
- Order: Coleoptera
- Suborder: Polyphaga
- Infraorder: Cucujiformia
- Family: Cerambycidae
- Genus: Thranius
- Species: T. gibbosus

Binomial name
- Thranius gibbosus Pascoe, 1859

Species of beetle

Thranius gibbosus is a species of longhorn beetle native to Sri Lanka and South India.
