= Xoanodera amoena =

Scientific classification
- Kingdom: Animalia
- Phylum: Arthropoda
- Class: Insecta
- Order: Coleoptera
- Suborder: Polyphaga
- Infraorder: Cucujiformia
- Family: Cerambycidae
- Genus: Xoanodera
- Species: X. amoena

Binomial name
- Xoanodera amoena Pascoe, 1885

Species of beetle

Xoanodera amoena is a species of longhorn beetle endemic to Sri Lanka.
