= Elius dilatatus =

Scientific classification
- Kingdom: Animalia
- Phylum: Arthropoda
- Class: Insecta
- Order: Coleoptera
- Family: Elateridae
- Genus: Elius
- Species: E. dilatatus

Binomial name
- Elius dilatatus Candèze, 1878

Species of beetle

Elius dilatatus is a species of click beetle found in India, Sri Lanka, Malaysia and Singapore.

== Description ==
Body length is about 16 to 17 mm.
