= List of Hydroporinae genera =

This is a list of genera in the subfamily Hydroporinae.

== Hydroporinae genera ==
- Africodytes Biström, 1988
- Agnoshydrus Biström, Nilsson and Wewalka, 1997
- Allodessus Guignot, 1953
- Allopachria Zimmermann, 1924
- Amarodytes Régimbart, 1900
- Andex Sharp, 1882
- Anginopachria Wewalka, Balke and Hendrich, 2001
- Anodocheilus Babington, 1841
- Antiporus Sharp, 1882
- Barretthydrus Lea, 1927
- Bidessodes Régimbart, 1900
- Bidessonotus Régimbart, 1895
- Bidessus Sharp, 1882
- Boreonectes
- Borneodessus Balke, Hendrich, Mazzoldi and Biström, 2002
- Brachyvatus Zimmermann, 1919
- Calicovatellus K. B. Miller and Lubkin, 2001
- Canthyporus Zimmermann, 1919
- Carabhydrus Watts, 1978
- Celina Aubé, 1837
- Chostonectes Sharp, 1880
- Clypeodytes Régimbart, 1894
- Coelambus
- Coelhydrus Sharp, 1882
- Comaldessus Spangler & Barr, 1995
- Crinodessus K. B. Miller, 1997
- Darwinhydrus Sharp, 1882
- Deronectes Sharp, 1882
- Derovatellus Sharp, 1882
- Desmopachria Babington, 1841
- Dimitshydrus Uéno, 1996
- Ereboporus K. B. Miller, Gibson and Alarie, 2009
- Fontidessus K. B. Miller and Spangler, 2008
- Geodessus Brancucci, 1979
- Gibbidessus Watts, 1978
- Glareadessus Wewalka and Biström, 1998
- Graptodytes Seidlitz, 1887
- Haideoporus Young and Longley, 1976
- Hemibidessus Zimmermann, 1921
- Heroceras Guignot, 1950
- Herophydrus Sharp, 1880
- Heterhydrus Fairmaire, 1869
- Heterosternuta Strand, 1935
- Hovahydrus Biström, 1982
- Huxelhydrus Sharp, 1882
- Hydrocolus Roughley & Larson in Larson, Alarie & Roughley, 2000
- Hydrodessus J. Balfour-Browne, 1953
- Hydroglyphus Motschulsky, 1853
- Hydropeplus Sharp, 1882
- Hydroporus Clairville, 1806
- Hydrovatus Motschulsky, 1853
- Hygrotus Stephens, 1828
- Hyphoporus Sharp, 1880
- Hyphovatus Wewalka and Biström, 1994
- Hyphydrus Illiger, 1802
- Hypodessus Guignot, 1939
- Iberoporus Castro and Delgado, 2001
- Kakadudessus Hendrich and Balke, 2009
- Kuschelydrus Ordish, 1976
- Laccornellus Roughley and Wolfe, 1987
- Laccornis Gozis, 1914
- Leiodytes Guignot, 1936
- Limbodessus Guignot, 1939
- Liodessus Guignot, 1939
- Lioporeus Guignot, 1950
- Megaporus Brinck, 1943
- Metaporus Guignot, 1945
- Methles Sharp, 1882
- Microdessus Young, 1967
- Microdytes J. Balfour-Browne, 1946
- Morimotoa Uéno, 1957
- Nebrioporus Régimbart, 1906
- Necterosoma W. J. MacLeay, 1871
- Neobidessodes Hendrich and Balke in Hendrich, Hawlitschek and Balke, 2009
- Neobidessus Young, 1967
- Neoclypeodytes Young, 1967
- Neonectes J. Balfour-Browne, 1944
- Neoporus Guignot, 1931
- Oreodytes Seidlitz, 1887
- Pachydrus Sharp, 1882
- Pachynectes Régimbart, 1903
- Papuadessus Balke, 2001
- Paroster Sharp, 1882
- Peschetius Guignot, 1942
- Phreatodessus Ordish, 1976
- Platydytes Biström, 1988
- Porhydrus Guignot, 1945
- Primospes Sharp, 1882
- Pseuduvarus Biström, 1988
- Psychopomporus Telles and Miller, 2012
- Queda Sharp, 1882
- Rhithrodytes Bameul, 1989
- Sanfilippodytes Franciscolo, 1979
- Scarodytes Gozis, 1914
- Sekaliporus Watts, 1997
- Sharphydrus Omer-Cooper, 1958
- Sheoldytes Miller and Sites, 2026
- Siamoporus Spangler, 1996
- Siettitia Abeille de Perrin, 1904
- Sinodytes Spangler, 1996
- Sternopriscus Sharp, 1880
- Stictonectes Brinck, 1943
- Stictotarsus Zimmermann, 1919
- Stygoporus Larson and LaBonte, 1994
- Suphrodytes Gozis, 1914
- Tepuidessus Spangler, 1981
- Terradessus Watts, 1982
- Tiporus Watts, 1985
- Trichonectes Guignot, 1941
- Trogloguignotus Sanfilippo, 1958
- Tyndallhydrus Sharp, 1882
- Typhlodessus Brancucci, 1985
- Uvarus Guignot, 1939
- Vatellus Aubé, 1837
- Yola Gozis, 1886
- Yolina Guignot, 1936
