= Bidessini =

Scientific classification
- Kingdom: Animalia
- Phylum: Arthropoda
- Class: Insecta
- Order: Coleoptera
- Suborder: Adephaga
- Family: Dytiscidae
- Subfamily: Hydroporinae
- Tribe: Bidessini; Sharp, 1880

Tribe of beetles

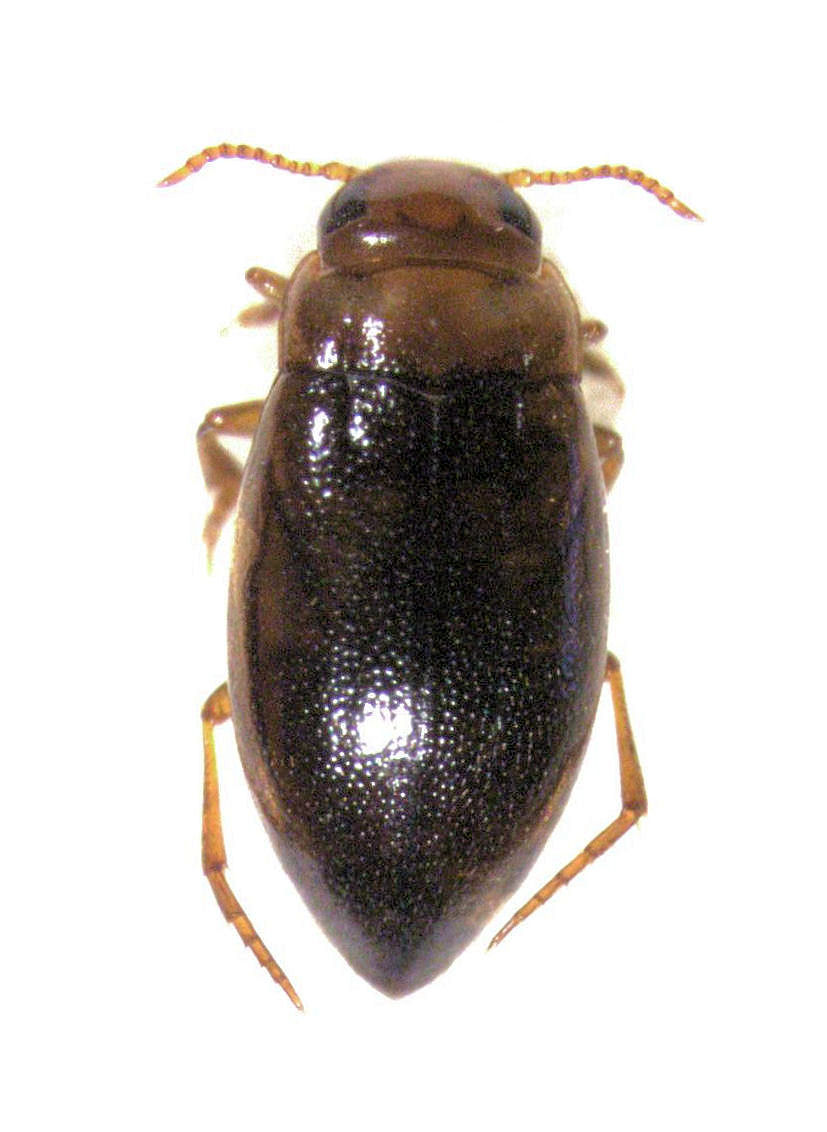
Adult Liodessus plicatus.

Bidessini is a tribe of predaceous diving beetles in the family Dytiscidae. There are at least 40 genera and at least 630 described species in Bidessini.

== Genera ==
This is a list of 40 genera in the tribe Bidessini.

- Africodytes Biström, 1988
- Allodessus Guignot, 1953
- Amarodytes Régimbart, 1900
- Anodocheilus Babington, 1841
- Bidessodes Régimbart, 1900
- Bidessonotus Régimbart, 1895
- Bidessus Sharp, 1882
- Borneodessus Balke, Hendrich, Mazzoldi and Biström, 2002
- Brachyvatus Zimmermann, 1919
- Clypeodytes Régimbart, 1894
- Comaldessus Spangler & Barr, 1995
- Crinodessus K. B. Miller, 1997
- Fontidessus K. B. Miller and Spangler, 2008
- Geodessus Brancucci, 1979
- Gibbidessus Watts, 1978
- Glareadessus Wewalka and Biström, 1998
- Hemibidessus Zimmermann, 1921
- Huxelhydrus Sharp, 1882
- Hydroglyphus Motschulsky, 1853
- Hypodessus Guignot, 1939
- Kakadudessus Hendrich and Balke, 2009
- Leiodytes Guignot, 1936
- Limbodessus Guignot, 1939
- Liodessus Guignot, 1939
- Microdessus Young, 1967
- Neobidessodes Hendrich and Balke in Hendrich, Hawlitschek and Balke, 2009
- Neobidessus Young, 1967
- Neoclypeodytes Young, 1967
- Pachynectes Régimbart, 1903
- Papuadessus Balke, 2001
- Platydytes Biström, 1988
- Pseuduvarus Biström, 1988
- Sharphydrus Omer-Cooper, 1958
- Sinodytes Spangler, 1996
- Tepuidessus Spangler, 1981
- Trogloguignotus Sanfilippo, 1958
- Tyndallhydrus Sharp, 1882
- Uvarus Guignot, 1939
- Yola Gozis, 1886
- Yolina Guignot, 1936
