= Hydroglyphus flaviculus =

Scientific classification
- Kingdom: Animalia
- Phylum: Arthropoda
- Class: Insecta
- Order: Coleoptera
- Suborder: Adephaga
- Family: Dytiscidae
- Subfamily: Hydroporinae
- Tribe: Bidessini
- Genus: Hydroglyphus
- Species: H. flaviculus

Binomial name
- Hydroglyphus flaviculus Motschulsky, 1861

Species of beetle

Hydroglyphus flaviculus, is a species of predaceous diving beetle found in Sri Lanka.
