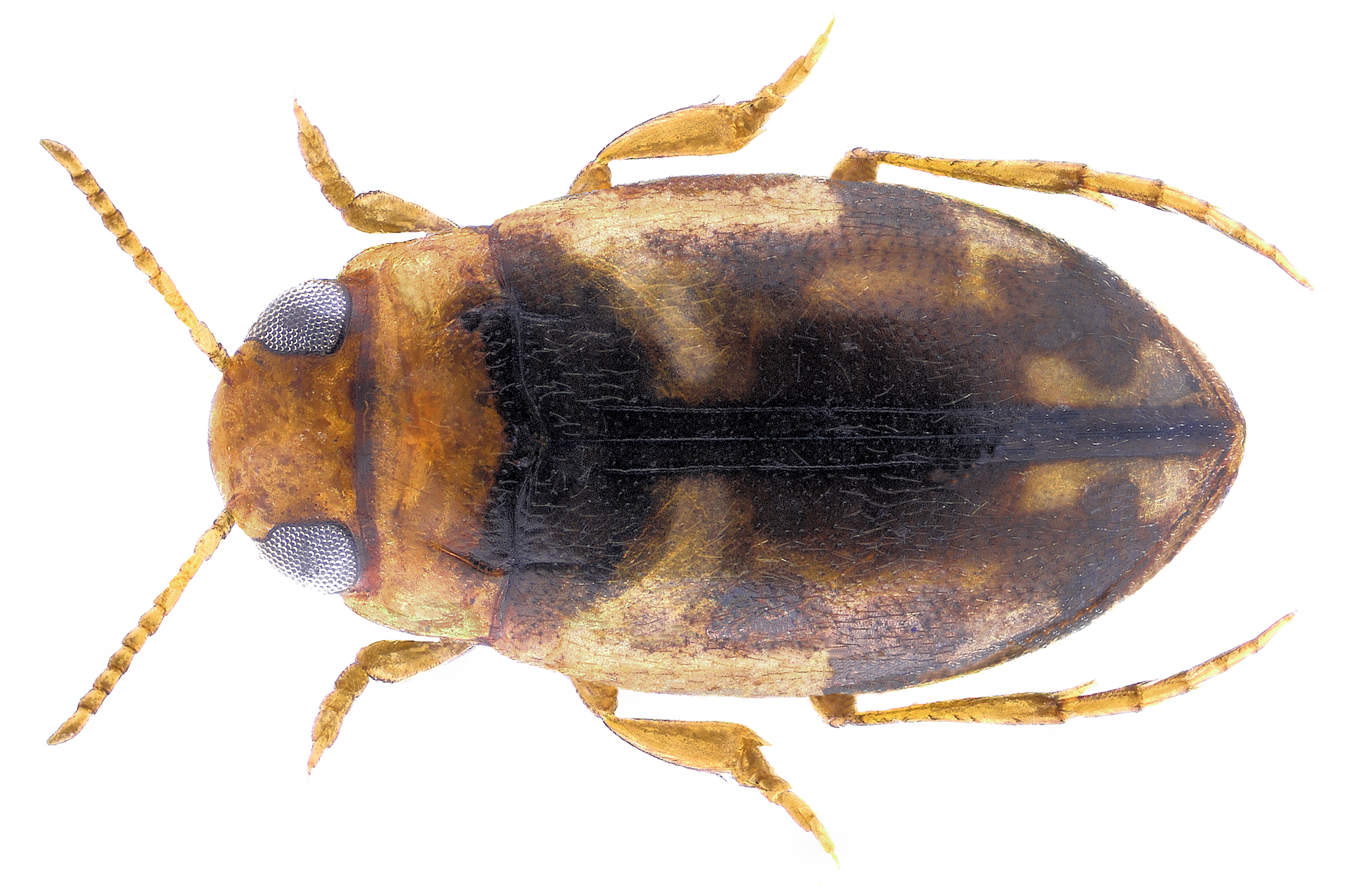
- Hydroglyphus inconstans

Scientific classification
- Kingdom: Animalia
- Phylum: Arthropoda
- Class: Insecta
- Order: Coleoptera
- Suborder: Adephaga
- Family: Dytiscidae
- Subfamily: Hydroporinae
- Tribe: Bidessini
- Genus: Hydroglyphus
- Species: H. inconstans

Binomial name
- Hydroglyphus inconstans (Régimbart, 1892)

Synonyms
- Bidessus inconstans Régimbart, 1892; Bidessus fulvescens Zimmermann, 1923; Guignotus fulvescens (Zimmermann, 1923); Guignotus inconstans (Régimbart, 1892)

= Hydroglyphus inconstans =

Species of beetle

Hydroglyphus inconstans, is a species of predaceous diving beetle found in India, Bangladesh, Bhutan, Myanmar, Nepal, Sri Lanka, China, Indonesia, Japan, Malaysia, and Taiwan. It is an alkaliphilous beetle species.
