= Hydroglyphus flammulatus =

Scientific classification
- Kingdom: Animalia
- Phylum: Arthropoda
- Class: Insecta
- Order: Coleoptera
- Suborder: Adephaga
- Family: Dytiscidae
- Subfamily: Hydroporinae
- Tribe: Bidessini
- Genus: Hydroglyphus
- Species: H. flammulatus

Binomial name
- Hydroglyphus flammulatus (Sharp, 1882)

Synonyms
- Hydrovatus flammulatus Sharp, 1882; Bidessus flammulatus Sharp, 1882; Guignotus flammulatus Guignot, 1954; Bidessus antennatus Regimbart, 1892; Guignotus antennatus Chujo & Sato, 1961

Species of beetle

Hydroglyphus flammulatus, is a species of predaceous diving beetle found in India, Sri Lanka, Pakistan, Thailand, Cambodia, China, Taiwan, Korea, Myanmar, Bangladesh, Indonesia, Vietnam, and Nepal.

== Description ==
Typical length is about 2.4 mm.
