= Queda =

Queda may refer to:

- The Fall (A Queda), a 1976 Brazilian film
- Queda, a genus of beetles
- a historical name for the Malaysian state of Kedah
