= Brachyvatus apicatus =

Scientific classification
- Domain: Eukaryota
- Kingdom: Animalia
- Phylum: Arthropoda
- Class: Insecta
- Order: Coleoptera
- Suborder: Adephaga
- Family: Dytiscidae
- Genus: Brachyvatus
- Species: B. apicatus

Binomial name
- Brachyvatus apicatus (Clark, 1862)

Synonyms
- Bidessus seminulum (LeConte, 1878); Brachyvatus seminulum (LeConte, 1878)

Species of beetle

Brachyvatus apicatus is a species of predaceous diving beetle in the family Dytiscidae. It is found in North America and the Neotropics.
