= Bidessonotus pulicarius =

Scientific classification
- Domain: Eukaryota
- Kingdom: Animalia
- Phylum: Arthropoda
- Class: Insecta
- Order: Coleoptera
- Suborder: Adephaga
- Family: Dytiscidae
- Genus: Bidessonotus
- Species: B. pulicarius

Binomial name
- Bidessonotus pulicarius (Aubé, 1838)

Synonyms
- Bidessus subsericeus Blatchley, 1919

Species of beetle

Bidessonotus pulicarius is a species of predaceous diving beetle in the family Dytiscidae. It is found in North America.
