= Microdessus =

Scientific classification
- Kingdom: Animalia
- Phylum: Arthropoda
- Class: Insecta
- Order: Coleoptera
- Suborder: Adephaga
- Family: Dytiscidae
- Subfamily: Hydroporinae
- Tribe: Bidessini
- Genus: Microdessus; Young, 1967
- Species: M. atomarius

Binomial name
- Microdessus atomarius (Sharp, 1882)

Genus of beetles

Microdessus is a genus of predaceous diving beetles in the family Dytiscidae. This genus has a single species, Microdessus atomarius, found in Brazil.
