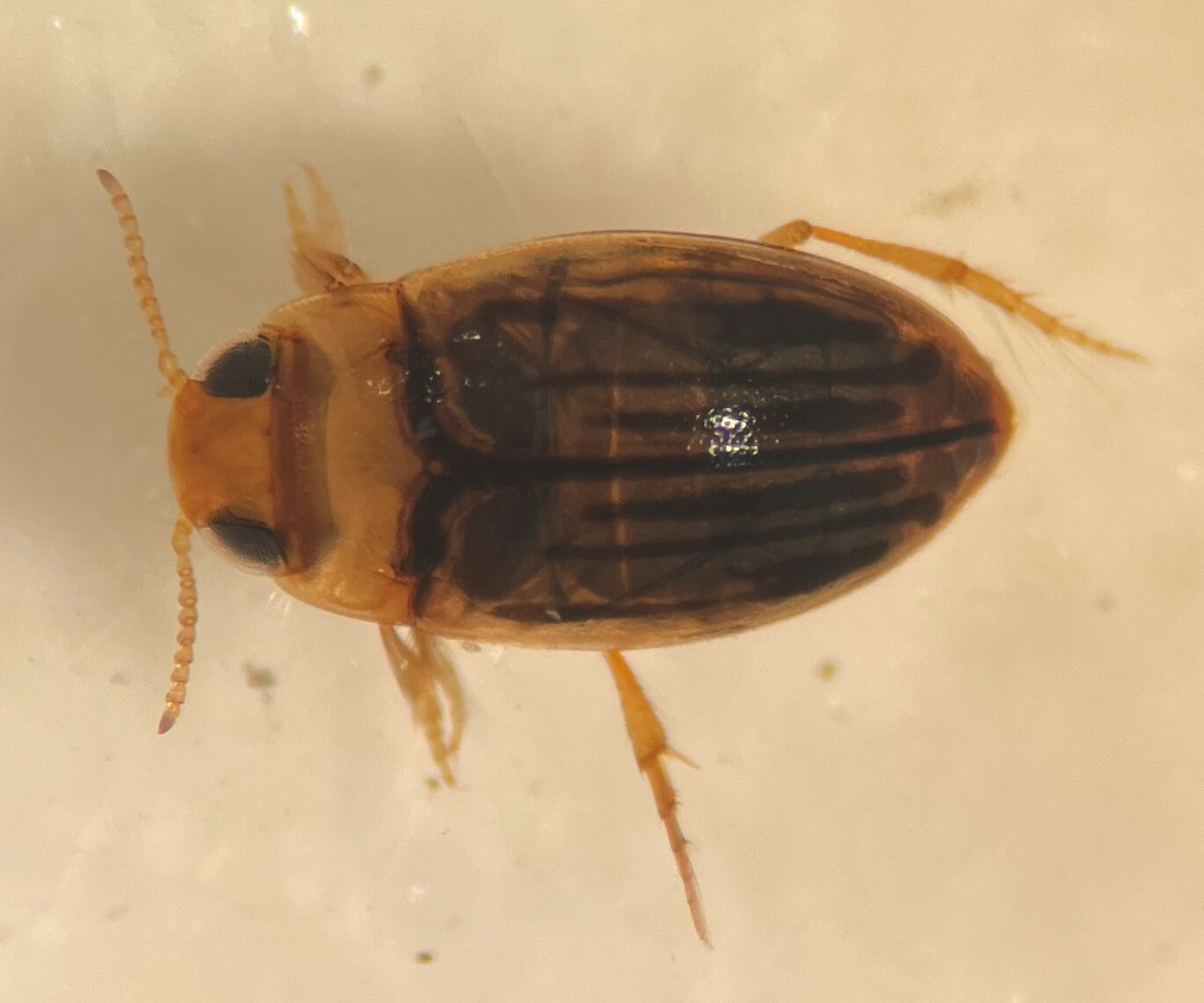

Scientific classification
- Kingdom: Animalia
- Phylum: Arthropoda
- Class: Insecta
- Order: Coleoptera
- Suborder: Adephaga
- Family: Dytiscidae
- Genus: Neobidessus
- Species: N. pulloides

Binomial name
- Neobidessus pulloides Young, 1977

= Neobidessus pulloides =

Species of beetle

Neobidessus pulloides is a species of predaceous diving beetle in the family Dytiscidae. It is found in North America and the Neotropics.
