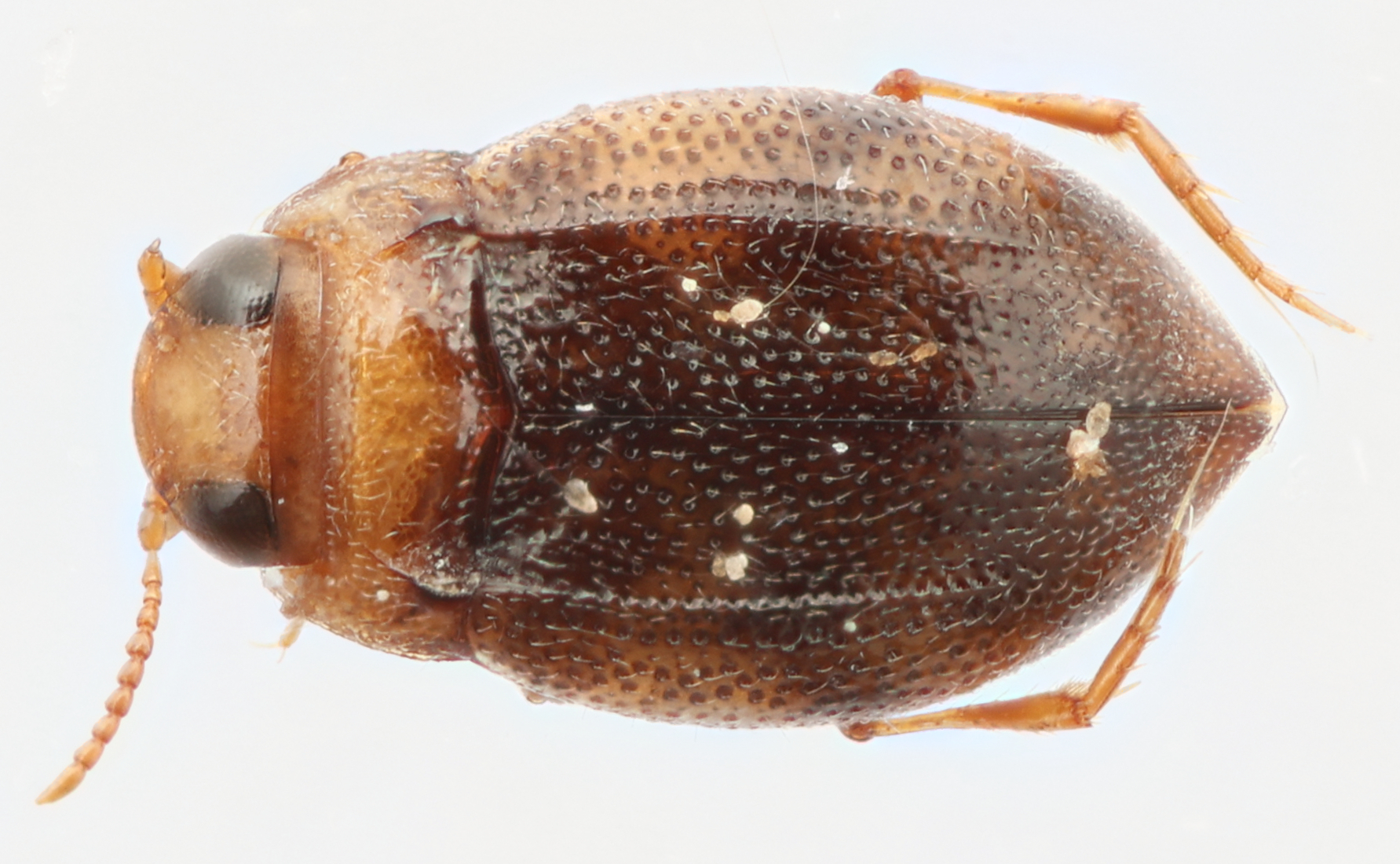

Scientific classification
- Kingdom: Animalia
- Phylum: Arthropoda
- Clade: Pancrustacea
- Class: Insecta
- Order: Coleoptera
- Suborder: Adephaga
- Family: Dytiscidae
- Genus: Anodocheilus
- Species: A. exiguus

Binomial name
- Anodocheilus exiguus (Aubé, 1838)

= Anodocheilus exiguus =

Species of beetle

Anodocheilus exiguus is a species of predaceous diving beetle in the family Dytiscidae. It is found in North America and the Neotropics.
