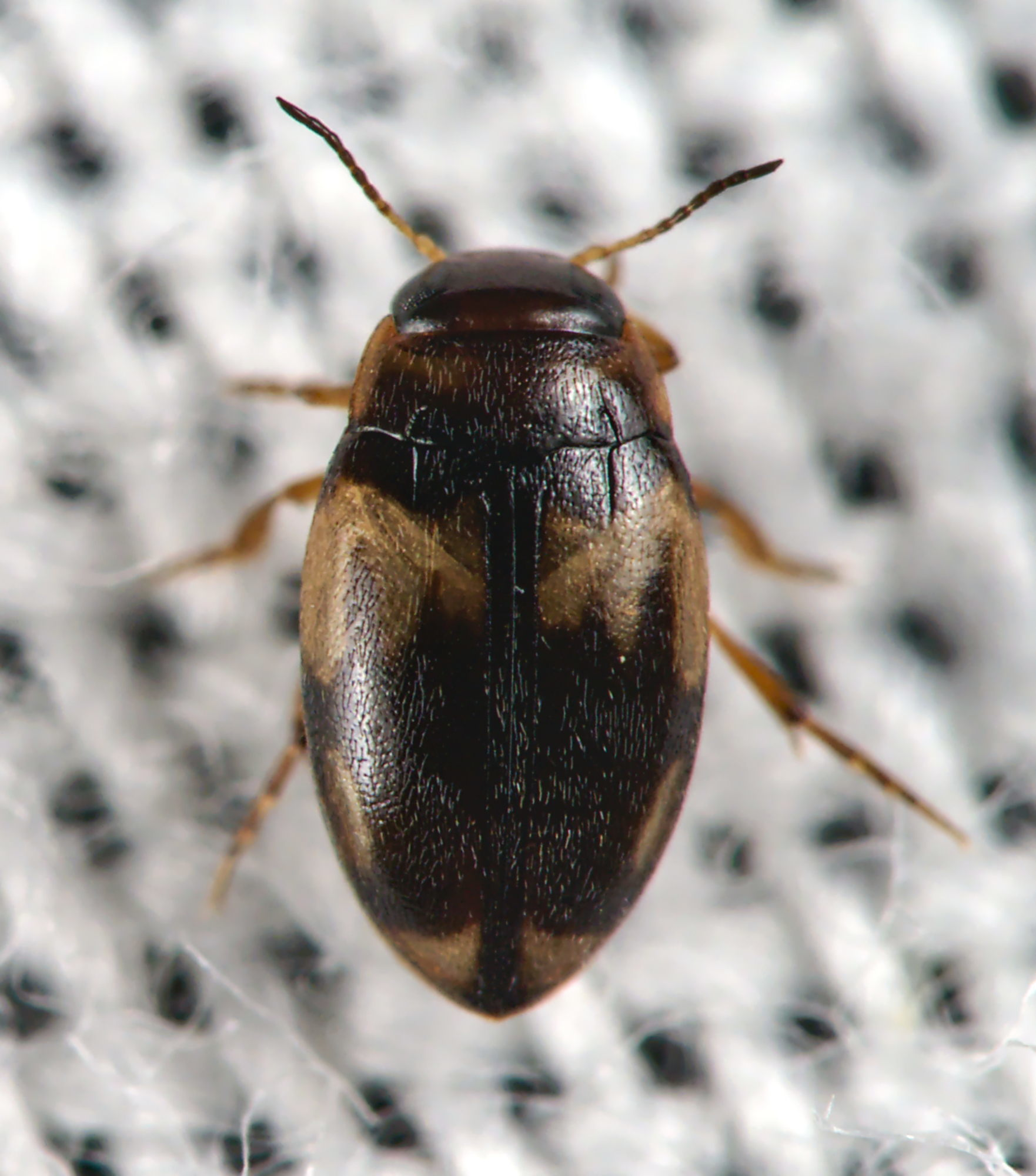
- Hydroglyphus geminus, Belgium

Scientific classification
- Kingdom: Animalia
- Phylum: Arthropoda
- Class: Insecta
- Order: Coleoptera
- Suborder: Adephaga
- Family: Dytiscidae
- Subfamily: Hydroporinae
- Tribe: Bidessini
- Genus: Hydroglyphus; Motschulsky, 1853

Synonyms
- Guignotus Houlbert, 1934

= Hydroglyphus =

Genus of beetles

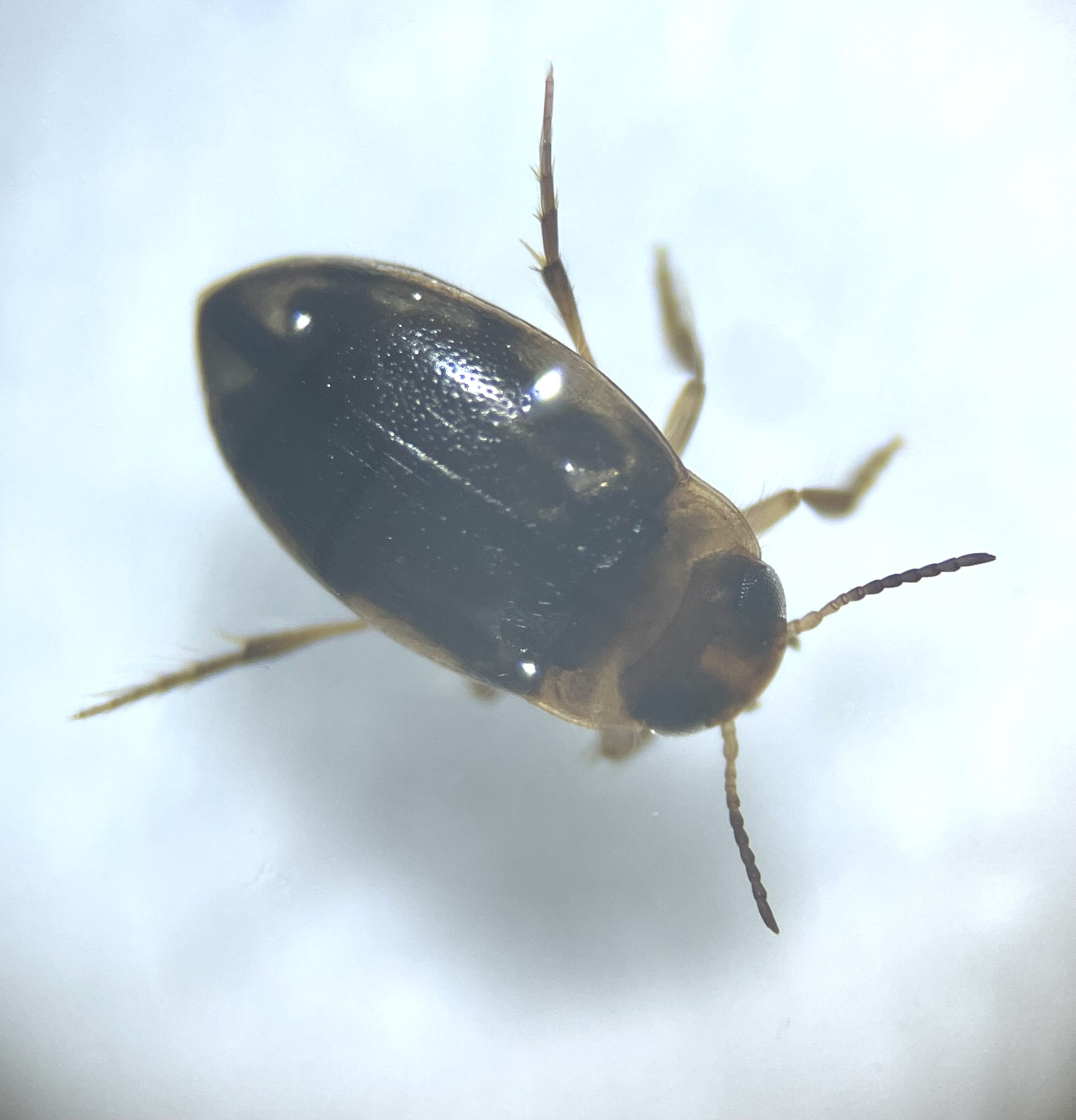
Hydroglyphus japonicus, Japan

Hydroglyphus is a genus of predaceous diving beetles in the family Dytiscidae. There are more than 90 described species in Hydroglyphus, found in Africa, Australasia, Indomalaya, and the Palearctic.

== Species ==
These 92 species belong to the genus Hydroglyphus:

- Hydroglyphus aethiopicus (Régimbart, 1907) (Africa)
- Hydroglyphus amamiensis (Satô, 1961) (the Palearctic)
- Hydroglyphus andamanensis Madani & Kumar, 2009 (Southern Asia)
- Hydroglyphus angularis (Klug, 1834) (Africa and the Palearctic)
- Hydroglyphus angulolineatus (Guignot, 1956) (Africa)
- Hydroglyphus annamita (Régimbart, 1889) (Indomalaya and the Palearctic)
- Hydroglyphus apertus (Guignot, 1941) (Africa)
- Hydroglyphus baeri (Régimbart, 1895) (Indomalaya)
- Hydroglyphus balkei Hendrich, 1999 (Australasia)
- Hydroglyphus basalis (W.J. Macleay, 1871) (Australasia)
- Hydroglyphus bilardoi Biström, 1986 (Africa)
- Hydroglyphus borkuanus (Bruneau de Miré & Legros, 1963) (Africa)
- Hydroglyphus capitatus (Régimbart, 1895) (Africa)
- Hydroglyphus circulatus (Régimbart, 1889) (Indomalaya)
- Hydroglyphus confusus (Klug, 1834) (Africa and the Palearctic)
- Hydroglyphus coreanus Lee & Ahn, 2016 (Southern Asia)
- Hydroglyphus crassifrons (Régimbart, 1903) (Indomalaya)
- Hydroglyphus daemeli (Sharp, 1882) (Australasia)
- Hydroglyphus dakarensis (Régimbart, 1895) (Africa)
- Hydroglyphus divisus (Régimbart, 1893) (Indomalaya)
- Hydroglyphus erannus (Guignot, 1956) (Indomalaya)
- Hydroglyphus farquharensis (Scott, 1912) (Africa)
- Hydroglyphus flammulatus (Sharp, 1882) (Indomalaya and the Palearctic)
- Hydroglyphus flaviculus Motschulsky, 1861 (Indomalaya)
- Hydroglyphus flavoguttatus (Régimbart, 1895) (Africa)
- Hydroglyphus flumineus (Omer-Cooper, 1959) (Africa)
- Hydroglyphus fufai (Omer-Cooper, 1931) (Africa)
- Hydroglyphus fulvaster (Guignot, 1955) (the Neotropics)
- Hydroglyphus fuscipennis (Sharp, 1882) (Indomalaya)
- Hydroglyphus gabonicus Bilardo & Rocchi, 1990 (Africa)
- Hydroglyphus geminodes (Régimbart, 1895) (Africa)
- Hydroglyphus geminus (Fabricius, 1792) (Indomalaya and the Palearctic)
- Hydroglyphus godeffroyi (Sharp, 1882) (Australasia)
- Hydroglyphus grammopterus (Zimmermann, 1928) (Australasia)
- Hydroglyphus gujaratensis (Vazirani, 1973) (Indomalaya and the Palearctic)
- Hydroglyphus hamulatus (Gyllenhal, 1813) (the Palearctic)
- Hydroglyphus hormuzensis Hájek & Brancucci, 2011 (the Palearctic)
- Hydroglyphus hummeli (Falkenström, 1932) (the Palearctic)
- Hydroglyphus incisus Biström, 1986 (Africa)
- Hydroglyphus incognitus Biström, 1986 (Africa)
- Hydroglyphus inconstans (Régimbart, 1892) (Indomalaya and the Palearctic)
- Hydroglyphus infirmus (Boheman, 1848) (Africa and the Palearctic)
- Hydroglyphus instriatus (Zimmermann, 1928) (Indomalaya)
- Hydroglyphus intermedius Biström, 1986 (Africa)
- Hydroglyphus japonicus (Sharp, 1873) (the Palearctic)
- Hydroglyphus kalaharii (Pederzani, 1982) (Africa)
- Hydroglyphus kifunei (Nakane, 1987) (the Palearctic)
- Hydroglyphus koppi (Régimbart, 1895) (Africa)
- Hydroglyphus laeticulus (Sharp, 1882) (Indomalaya)
- Hydroglyphus leai (Guignot, 1942) (Australasia)
- Hydroglyphus lenzi (Gschwendtner, 1930) (Africa)
- Hydroglyphus licenti (Feng, 1936) (the Palearctic)
- Hydroglyphus lineolatus (Boheman, 1848) (Africa)
- Hydroglyphus lobulatus (Wewalka, 1980) (Africa)
- Hydroglyphus luteolus (Régimbart, 1899) (Indomalaya)
- Hydroglyphus major (Sharp, 1882) (Africa and the Palearctic)
- Hydroglyphus marmottani (Guignot, 1941) (Africa)
- Hydroglyphus mastersii (W.J. Macleay, 1871) (Australasia)
- Hydroglyphus milkoi (Omer-Cooper, 1931) (Africa)
- Hydroglyphus milleri Madani & Kumar, 2009 (Southern Asia)
- Hydroglyphus mysorensis (Régimbart, 1903) (Indomalaya)
- Hydroglyphus noteroides (Régimbart, 1883) (Indomalaya)
- Hydroglyphus orientalis (Clark, 1863) (Australasia, Indomalaya, and the Palearctic)
- Hydroglyphus orthogrammus (Sharp, 1882) (Australasia)
- Hydroglyphus ovatus (Bilardo, 1982) (Africa)
- Hydroglyphus paludivagus (Omer-Cooper, 1959) (Africa)
- Hydroglyphus pendjabensis (Guignot, 1954) (Indomalaya and the Palearctic)
- Hydroglyphus pentagrammus (Schaum, 1864) (Africa and the Palearctic)
- Hydroglyphus perssoni Biström & Nilsson, 1990 (Africa)
- Hydroglyphus plagiatus (H.J. Kolbe, 1883) (Africa)
- Hydroglyphus pradhani (Vazirani, 1969) (Indomalaya)
- Hydroglyphus pseudoctoguttatus Biström, 2000 (Africa)
- Hydroglyphus pseudogeminus (Régimbart, 1877) (Indomalaya)
- Hydroglyphus regimbarti (Gschwendtner, 1936) (Indomalaya and the Palearctic)
- Hydroglyphus rocchii Biström, 1986 (Africa)
- Hydroglyphus roeri Biström & Wewalka, 1984 (Africa)
- Hydroglyphus shalensis (Omer-Cooper, 1931) (Africa)
- Hydroglyphus signatellus (Klug, 1834) (Africa and the Palearctic)
- Hydroglyphus signatus (Sharp, 1882) (Australasia)
- Hydroglyphus sinuspersicus Hájek & Wewalka, 2009 (the Palearctic)
- Hydroglyphus socotraensis Wewalka, 2004 (the Palearctic)
- Hydroglyphus sordidus (Sharp, 1882) (Africa)
- Hydroglyphus speculum (Bruneau de Miré & Legros, 1963) (Africa)
- Hydroglyphus splendidus (Gschwendtner, 1930) (Indomalaya)
- Hydroglyphus strigicollis (Fairmaire, 1880) (Africa)
- Hydroglyphus striola (Sharp, 1882) (Australasia and Indomalaya)
- Hydroglyphus transvaalensis (Régimbart, 1894) (Africa)
- Hydroglyphus transversus (Sharp, 1882) (Indomalaya)
- Hydroglyphus trassaerti (Feng, 1936) (the Palearctic)
- Hydroglyphus trifasciatus (Watts, 1978) (Australasia)
- Hydroglyphus vitchumwii (Gschwendtner, 1935) (Africa)
- Hydroglyphus zanzibarensis (Régimbart, 1906) (Africa)
