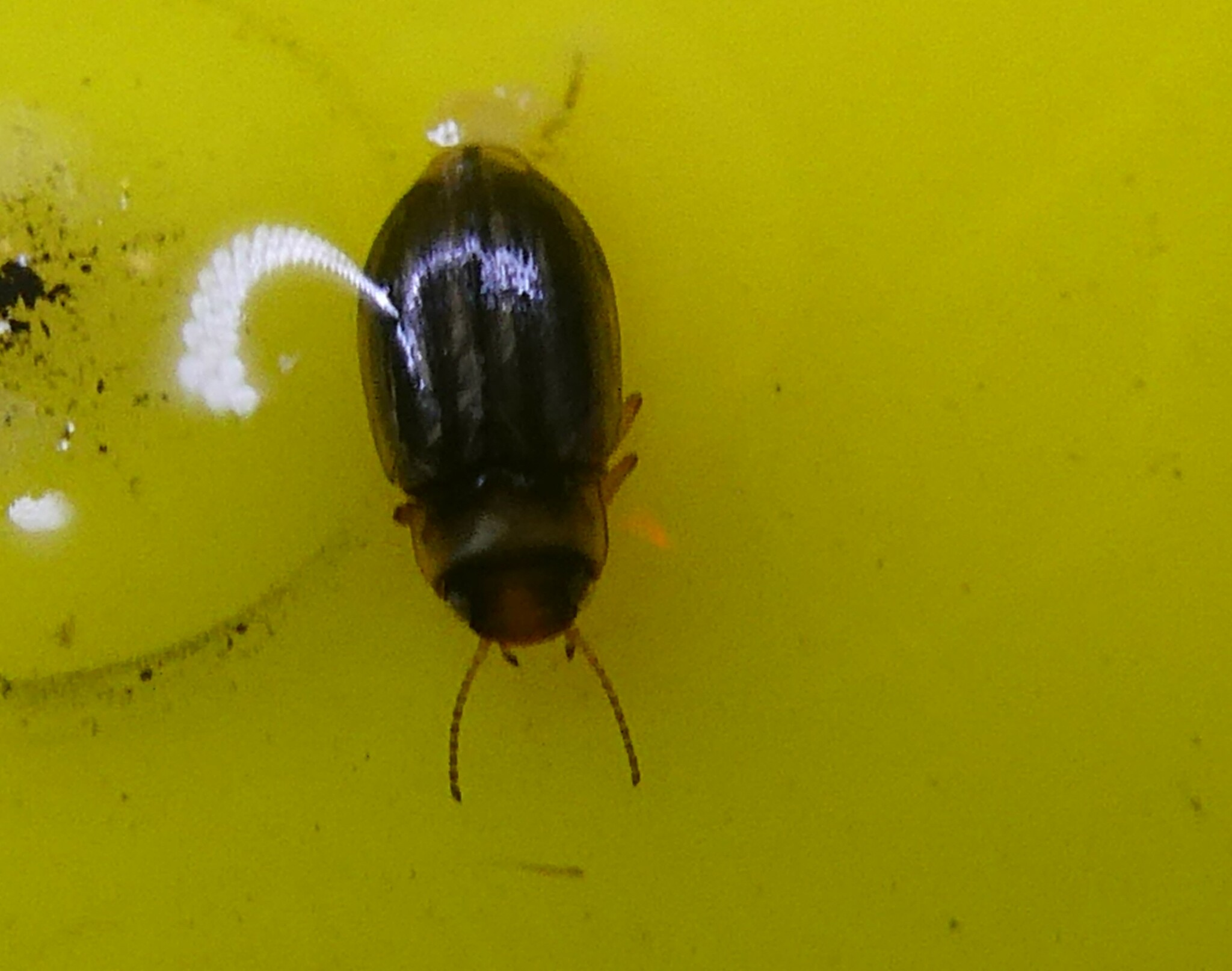
- Huxelhydrus syntheticus, New Zealand

Scientific classification
- Kingdom: Animalia
- Phylum: Arthropoda
- Class: Insecta
- Order: Coleoptera
- Suborder: Adephaga
- Family: Dytiscidae
- Subfamily: Hydroporinae
- Tribe: Bidessini
- Genus: Huxelhydrus; Sharp, 1882
- Species: H. syntheticus

Binomial name
- Huxelhydrus syntheticus Sharp, 1882

= Huxelhydrus =

Huxelhydrus syntheticus

Genus of beetles

Huxelhydrus is a genus of predaceous diving beetles in the family Dytiscidae. This genus has a single species, Huxelhydrus syntheticus, found in New Zealand.
