= Fontidessus =

Scientific classification
- Domain: Eukaryota
- Kingdom: Animalia
- Phylum: Arthropoda
- Class: Insecta
- Order: Coleoptera
- Suborder: Adephaga
- Family: Dytiscidae
- Subfamily: Hydroporinae
- Tribe: Bidessini
- Genus: Fontidessus; K.B. Miller & Spangler, 2008

Genus of beetles

Fontidessus is a genus of predaceous diving beetles in the family Dytiscidae. There are about seven described species in Fontidessus. They are found in the Neotropics.

== Species ==
These seven species belong to the genus Fontidessus:

- Fontidessus aquarupe K.B. Miller & Montano, 2014
- Fontidessus bettae K.B. Miller & Montano, 2014
- Fontidessus christineae K.B. Miller & Montano, 2014
- Fontidessus microphthalmus K.B. Miller & Montano, 2014
- Fontidessus ornatus K.B. Miller, 2008
- Fontidessus toboganensis K.B. Miller & Spangler, 2008
- Fontidessus wheeleri K.B. Miller, 2008
