= Clypeodytes bufo =

Scientific classification
- Kingdom: Animalia
- Phylum: Arthropoda
- Class: Insecta
- Order: Coleoptera
- Suborder: Adephaga
- Family: Dytiscidae
- Genus: Clypeodytes
- Species: C. bufo

Binomial name
- Clypeodytes bufo (Sharp, 1890)

Synonyms
- Bidessus bufo Sharp, 1890

Species of beetle

Clypeodytes bufo, is a species of predaceous diving beetle found in India, Bangladesh, Myanmar, Sri Lanka, China, and Vietnam.

== Description ==
It is an alkaliphilous species inhabited in the basic waters.
