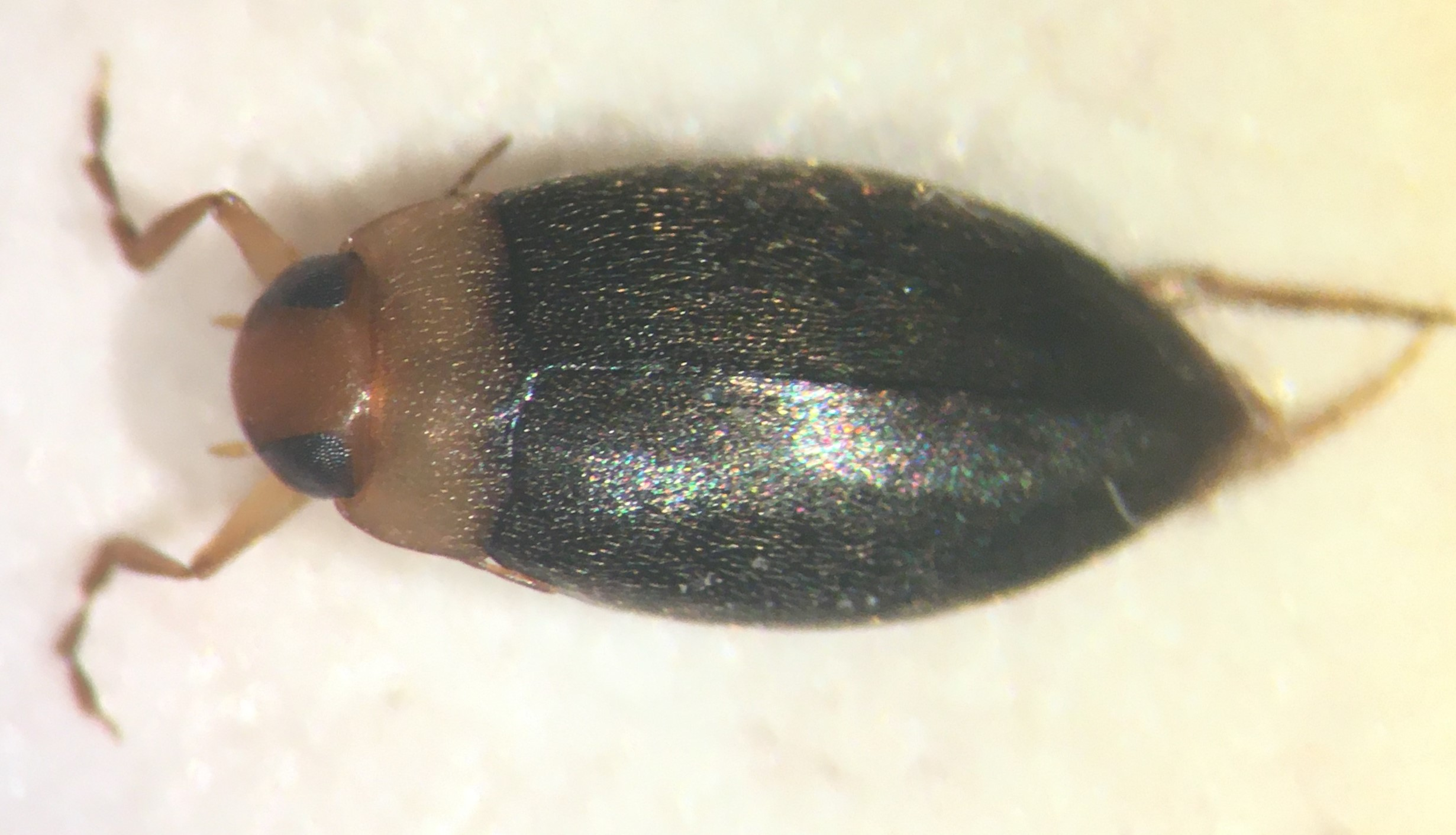

Scientific classification
- Kingdom: Animalia
- Phylum: Arthropoda
- Class: Insecta
- Order: Coleoptera
- Suborder: Adephaga
- Family: Dytiscidae
- Subfamily: Hydroporinae
- Genus: Derovatellus; Sharp, 1882

= Derovatellus =

Genus of beetles

Derovatellus is a genus of beetles in the family Dytiscidae, containing the following species:

- Derovatellus africanus Régimbart, 1889
- Derovatellus alluaudi Guignot, 1936
- Derovatellus assinicus Régimbart, 1889
- Derovatellus ater Bilardo & Pederzani, 1978
- Derovatellus baloghi Biström, 1979
- Derovatellus bisignatus Ahlwarth, 1921
- Derovatellus bistroemi Brancucci, 1981
- Derovatellus bruchi Zimmermann, 1919
- Derovatellus caprai Guignot, 1952
- Derovatellus corvus Guignot, 1954
- Derovatellus dagombae Biström, 1979
- Derovatellus decellei Biström, 1979
- Derovatellus dimorphus Guignot, 1936
- Derovatellus duplex Guignot, 1956
- Derovatellus erratus Biström, 1979
- Derovatellus eupteryx Guignot, 1955
- Derovatellus fasciatus Régimbart, 1895
- Derovatellus ferrugineus Bilardo & Pederzani, 1978
- Derovatellus floridanus Fall, 1932
- Derovatellus hancocki Biström, 1981
- Derovatellus intermedius Biström, 1986
- Derovatellus kamerunensis Biström, 1979
- Derovatellus lentus (Wehncke, 1876)
- Derovatellus lugubris Guignot, 1955
- Derovatellus macrocolus Guignot, 1956
- Derovatellus marmottani Guignot, 1940
- Derovatellus mocquerysi Régimbart, 1895
- Derovatellus natalensis Omer-Cooper, 1965
- Derovatellus nyanzae Biström, 1980
- Derovatellus obscurus Régimbart, 1895
- Derovatellus olofi Franciscolo & Sanfilippo, 1991
- Derovatellus onorei Biström, 1982
- Derovatellus orientalis Wehncke, 1883
- Derovatellus peruanus Spangler, 1967
- Derovatellus regimbarti Guignot, 1936
- Derovatellus roosevelti K.B.Miller, 2005
- Derovatellus rostrata (Koch & Berendt, 1854)
- Derovatellus ruficollis Régimbart, 1895
- Derovatellus satoi Biström, 2003
- Derovatellus spangleri K.B.Miller, 2005
- Derovatellus taeniatus Biström, 1979
- Derovatellus wewalkai Biström, 1979
- Derovatellus wittei Biström, 1979
