= Calicovatellus =

Calicovatellus Temporal range: 20.43–15.97 Ma

Scientific classification
- Kingdom: Animalia
- Phylum: Arthropoda
- Clade: Pancrustacea
- Class: Insecta
- Order: Coleoptera
- Suborder: Adephaga
- Family: Dytiscidae
- Tribe: Vatellini
- Genus: †Calicovatellus; K.B.Miller & Lubkin, 2001

Type species
- †Calicovatellus petrodytes K.B.Miller & Lubkin, 2001

Genus of beetles

Calicovatellus is an extinct genus of dytiscid beetle in the subfamily Hydroporinae. As of 2018, only one species is recognized, Calicovatellus petrodytes. It was found in the Barstow Formation in southern California and dates to the Miocene.
