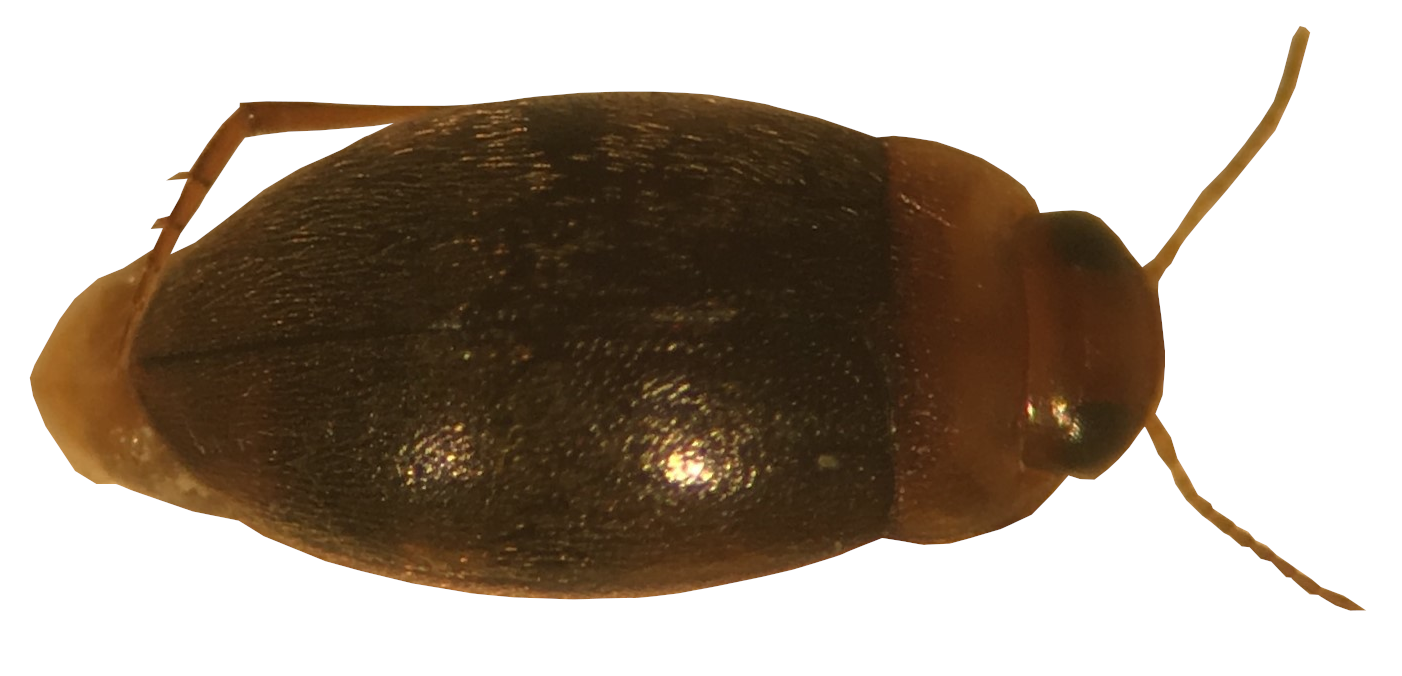

Scientific classification
- Domain: Eukaryota
- Kingdom: Animalia
- Phylum: Arthropoda
- Class: Insecta
- Order: Coleoptera
- Suborder: Adephaga
- Family: Dytiscidae
- Genus: Bidessonotus
- Species: B. inconspicuus

Binomial name
- Bidessonotus inconspicuus (LeConte, 1855)

= Bidessonotus inconspicuus =

Species of beetle

Bidessonotus inconspicuus is a species of predaceous diving beetles in the family Dytiscidae. It is found in North America.

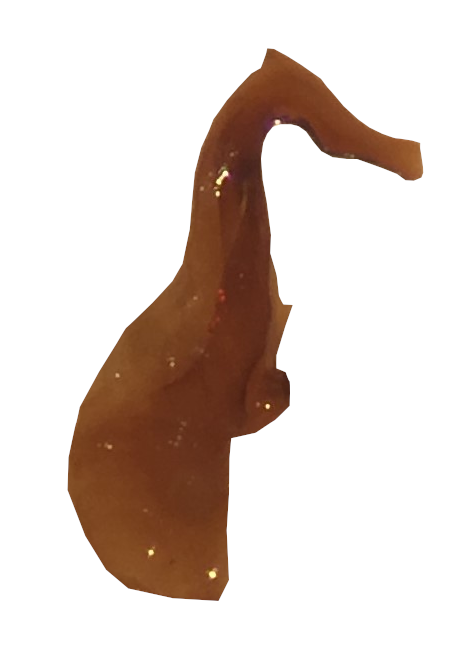
Aedeagus
