= Pseuduvarus vitticollis =

Scientific classification
- Kingdom: Animalia
- Phylum: Arthropoda
- Class: Insecta
- Order: Coleoptera
- Suborder: Adephaga
- Family: Dytiscidae
- Genus: Pseuduvarus
- Species: P. vitticollis

Binomial name
- Pseuduvarus vitticollis (Boheman, 1848)

Synonyms
- Hydroporus vitticollis Boheman, 1848; Amarodytes octoguttatus caligosus Guignot, 1946; Bidessus gentilis Sharp, 1890; Uvarus monticola Guignot, 1957; Bidessus octoguttatus Régimbart, 1895; Bidessus ornatipennis Régimbart, 1900

Species of beetle

Pseuduvarus vitticollis, is a species of predaceous diving beetle found in India, Nepal, Pakistan, Sri Lanka, China, Madagascar, Malaysia, Taiwan and African region.
