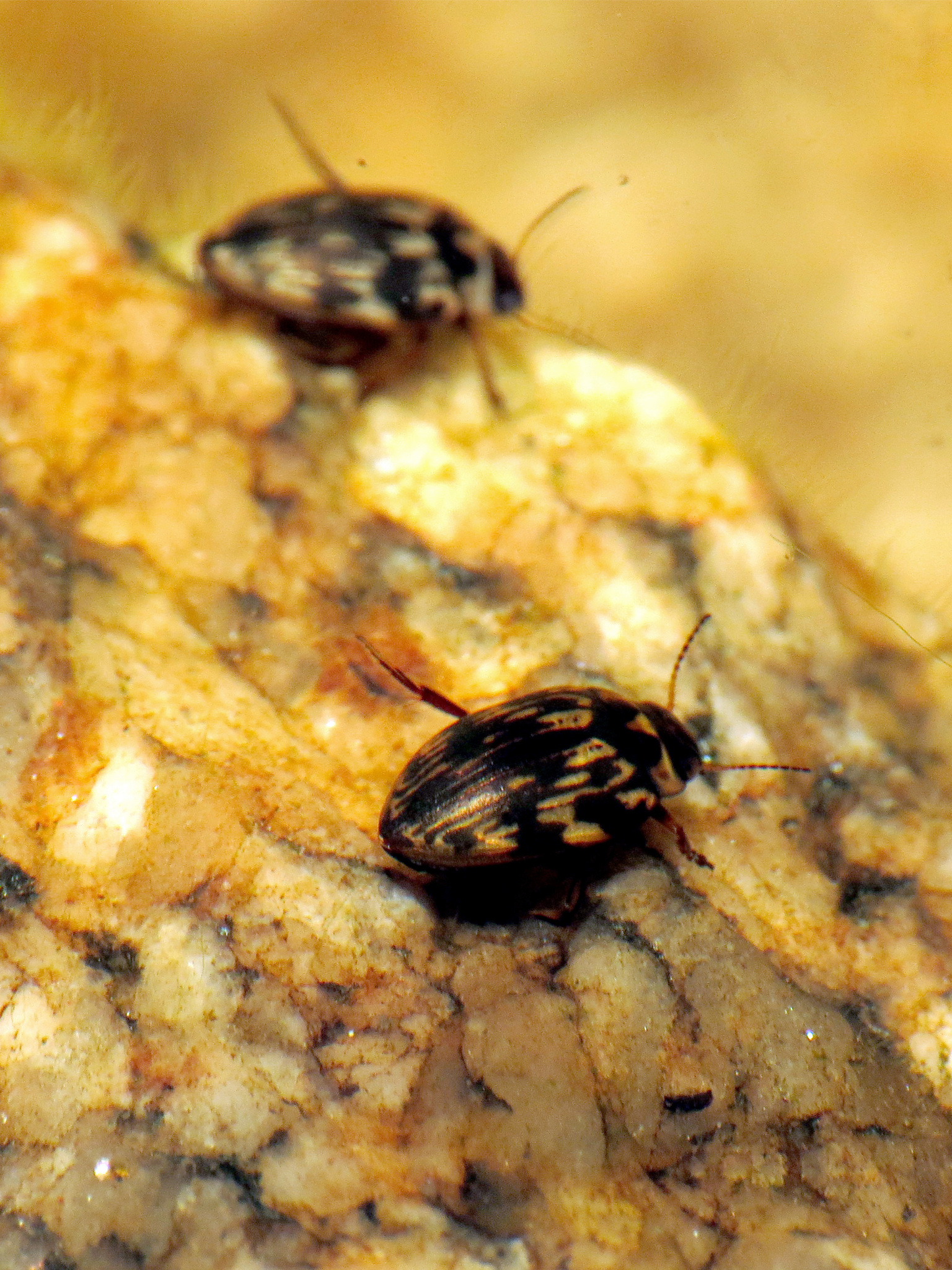
- Boreonectes aequinoctialis

Scientific classification
- Domain: Eukaryota
- Kingdom: Animalia
- Phylum: Arthropoda
- Class: Insecta
- Order: Coleoptera
- Suborder: Adephaga
- Family: Dytiscidae
- Subfamily: Hydroporinae
- Tribe: Hydroporini
- Genus: Boreonectes; Angus, 2010

= Boreonectes =

Genus of beetles

Boreonectes is a genus of predaceous diving beetles in the family Dytiscidae. There are about 16 described species in Boreonectes. They are found in North America, the Neotropics, and the Palearctic.

== Species ==
These 16 species belong to the genus Boreonectes:

- Boreonectes aequinoctialis (H.Clark, 1862)
- Boreonectes alpestris (Dutton & Angus, 2007)
- Boreonectes coelamboides (Fall, 1923)
- Boreonectes dolerosus (Leech, 1945)
- Boreonectes emmerichi (Falkenström, 1936)
- Boreonectes expositus (Fall, 1923)
- Boreonectes funereus (Crotch, 1873)
- Boreonectes griseostriatus (De Geer, 1774)
- Boreonectes ibericus (Dutton & Angus, 2007)
- Boreonectes inexpectatus (Dutton & Angus, 2007)
- Boreonectes macedonicus (Guéorguiev, 1959)
- Boreonectes multilineatus (Falkenström, 1922)
- Boreonectes panaminti (Fall, 1923)
- Boreonectes riberae (Dutton & Angus, 2007)
- Boreonectes spenceri
- Boreonectes striatellus (LeConte, 1852)
