= Lioporeus pilatei =

Scientific classification
- Domain: Eukaryota
- Kingdom: Animalia
- Phylum: Arthropoda
- Class: Insecta
- Order: Coleoptera
- Suborder: Adephaga
- Family: Dytiscidae
- Genus: Lioporeus
- Species: L. pilatei

Binomial name
- Lioporeus pilatei (Fall, 1917)

Synonyms
- Hydroporus pilatei Fall, 1917

Species of beetle

Lioporeus pilatei is a species of predaceous diving beetle in the family Dytiscidae. It is found in North America.
