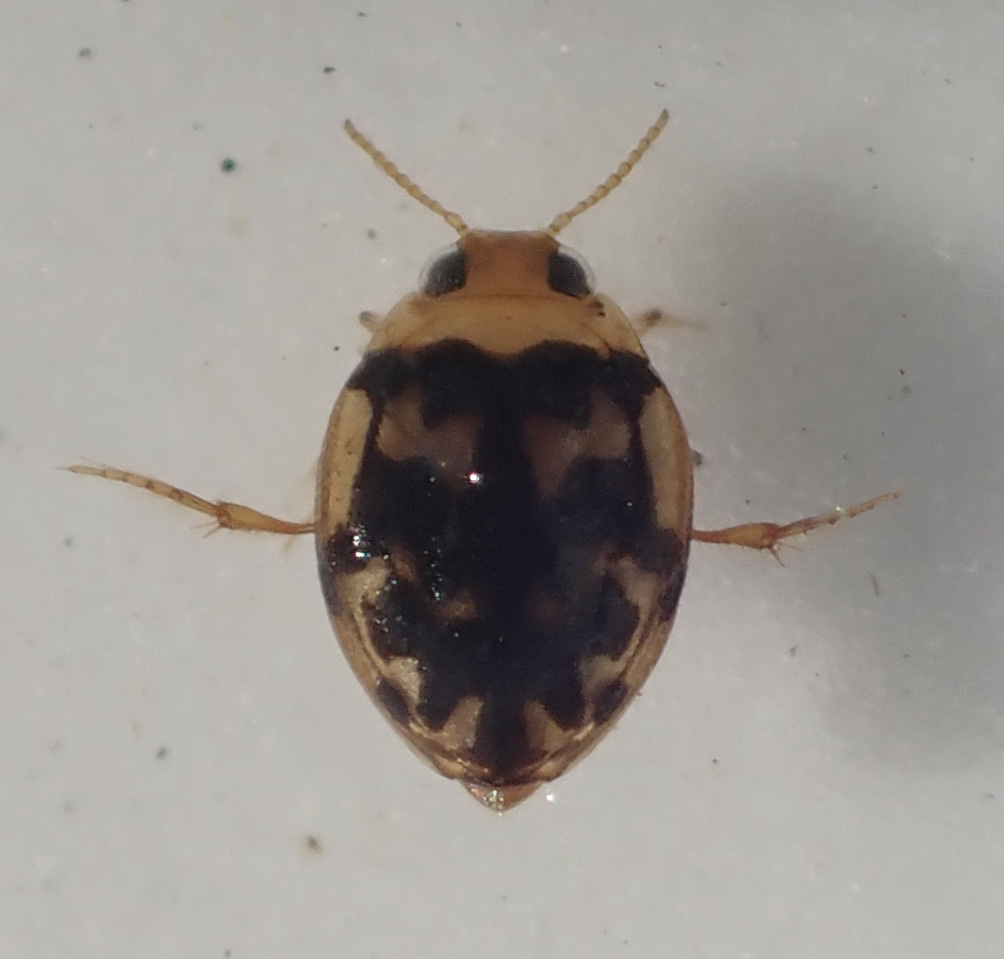
- Yola, Namibia

Scientific classification
- Domain: Eukaryota
- Kingdom: Animalia
- Phylum: Arthropoda
- Class: Insecta
- Order: Coleoptera
- Suborder: Adephaga
- Family: Dytiscidae
- Subfamily: Hydroporinae
- Tribe: Bidessini
- Genus: Yola; Gozis, 1886

Synonyms
- Yolula Guignot, 1950

= Yola (beetle) =

Genus of beetles

Yola is a genus of diving beetles in the family Dytiscidae. There are more than 40 described species in Yola, found in Africa, Asia, and Europe.

== Species ==
These 48 species belong to the genus Yola:

- Yola alluaudi Peschet, 1926 (Africa)
- Yola babaulti Peschet, 1921 (Africa)
- Yola batekensis Bilardo & Rocchi, 2008 (Africa)
- Yola bertrandi Guignot, 1952 (Africa)
- Yola bicarinata (Latreille, 1804) (Europe, Asia)
- Yola bicostata Zimmermann, 1926 (Africa)
- Yola bicristata (Sharp, 1882) (Europe, Asia)
- Yola bistroemi Rocchi, 2000 (Africa)
- Yola buettikeri Brancucci, 1985 (Europe, Asia)
- Yola consanguinea (Régimbart, 1892) (Southern Asia)
- Yola costipennis (Fairmaire, 1869) (Africa)
- Yola counselli Biström, 1991 (Africa)
- Yola cuspis Bilardo & Pederzani, 1978 (Africa)
- Yola darfurensis J. Balfour-Browne, 1947 (Africa)
- Yola deviata Biström, 1987 (Africa)
- Yola dilatata Régimbart, 1906 (Africa)
- Yola dohrni (Sharp, 1882) (Africa)
- Yola endroedyi Biström, 1983 (Africa)
- Yola enigmatica Omer-Cooper, 1954 (Africa)
- Yola ferruginea Biström, 1987 (Africa)
- Yola fluviatica Guignot, 1952 (Africa)
- Yola frontalis Régimbart, 1906 (Africa)
- Yola gabonica Biström, 1983 (Africa)
- Yola grandicollis Peschet, 1921 (Africa)
- Yola indica Biström, 1983 (Southern Asia)
- Yola intermedia Biström, 1983 (Africa)
- Yola kivuana Guignot, 1958 (Africa)
- Yola marginata Biström, 1983 (Africa)
- Yola matsikammae Bilton, 2015 (Africa)
- Yola mocquerysi (Régimbart, 1894) (Africa)
- Yola natalensis (Régimbart, 1894) (Africa)
- Yola nigrosignata Régimbart, 1895 (Africa)
- Yola nilgirica Biström, 1983 (Southern Asia)
- Yola ocris Guignot, 1953 (Africa)
- Yola orientalis Hájek, 2009 (Southern Asia)
- Yola panelii Biström, 1982 (Africa)
- Yola peringueyi Guignot, 1942 (Africa)
- Yola pinheyi Biström, 1983 (Africa)
- Yola porcata (Klug, 1834) (Africa)
- Yola senegalensis Régimbart, 1895 (Africa)
- Yola simulantis Omer-Cooper, 1965 (Africa)
- Yola subcostata Bilardo & Rocchi, 1999 (Africa)
- Yola subopaca Régimbart, 1895 (Africa)
- Yola swierstrai Gschwendtner, 1935 (Africa)
- Yola tschoffeni Régimbart, 1895 (Africa)
- Yola tuberculata Régimbart, 1895 (Africa)
- Yola unguicularis Hájek & Reiter, 2019 (Europe, Asia)
- Yola wraniki Wewalka, 2004 (Europe, Asia)
