= Sheoldytes =

Scientific classification
- Kingdom: Animalia
- Phylum: Arthropoda
- Clade: Pancrustacea
- Class: Insecta
- Order: Coleoptera
- Suborder: Adephaga
- Family: Dytiscidae
- Subfamily: Hydroporinae
- Tribe: Hydroporini
- Genus: Sheoldytes; Miller & Sites, 2026
- Species: S. ozarkensis

Binomial name
- Sheoldytes ozarkensis Miller & Sites, 2026

Genus of beetles

Sheoldytes ozarkensis is a species of beetle in the family Dytiscidae, the only species in the genus Sheoldytes. It is known from a single female specimen from the Jacks Fork River in the Ozark Mountains of Missouri, United States.
