= Rhithrodytes agnus =

Conservation status
- Endangered (IUCN 2.3)

Scientific classification
- Kingdom: Animalia
- Phylum: Arthropoda
- Class: Insecta
- Order: Coleoptera
- Suborder: Adephaga
- Family: Dytiscidae
- Genus: Rhithrodytes
- Species: R. agnus

Binomial name
- Rhithrodytes agnus Foster, 1993

Species of beetle

Rhithrodytes agnus is a species of beetle in family Dytiscidae. It is endemic to Portugal.
