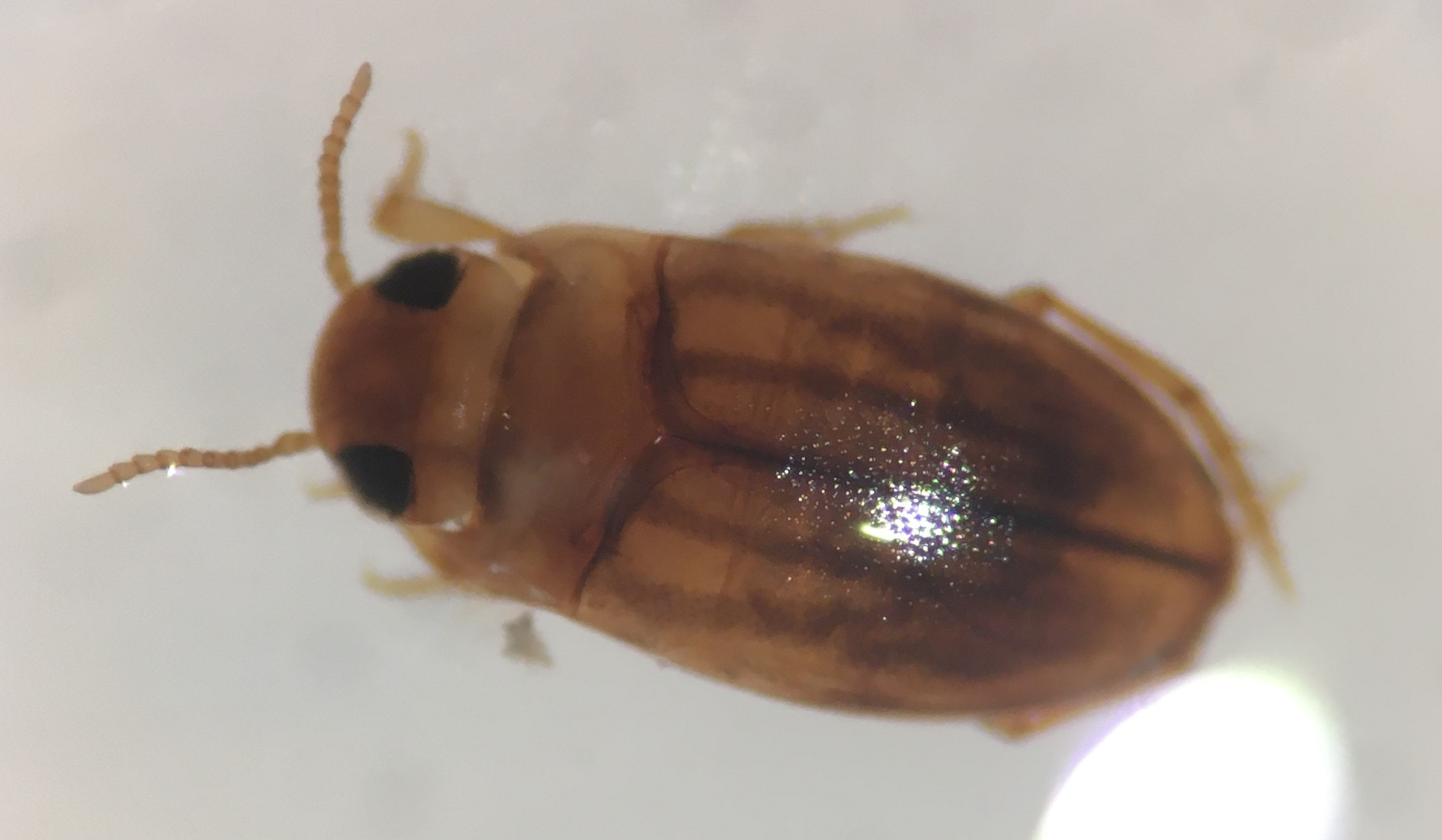

Scientific classification
- Domain: Eukaryota
- Kingdom: Animalia
- Phylum: Arthropoda
- Class: Insecta
- Order: Coleoptera
- Suborder: Adephaga
- Family: Dytiscidae
- Genus: Neobidessus
- Species: N. pullus

Binomial name
- Neobidessus pullus (LeConte, 1855)

= Neobidessus pullus =

Species of beetle

Neobidessus pullus is a species of predaceous diving beetle in the family Dytiscidae. It is found in North America and the Neotropics.

== Subspecies ==
These two subspecies belong to the species Neobidessus pullus:

- Neobidessus pullus floridanus (Fall, 1917)
- Neobidessus pullus pullus (LeConte, 1855)
