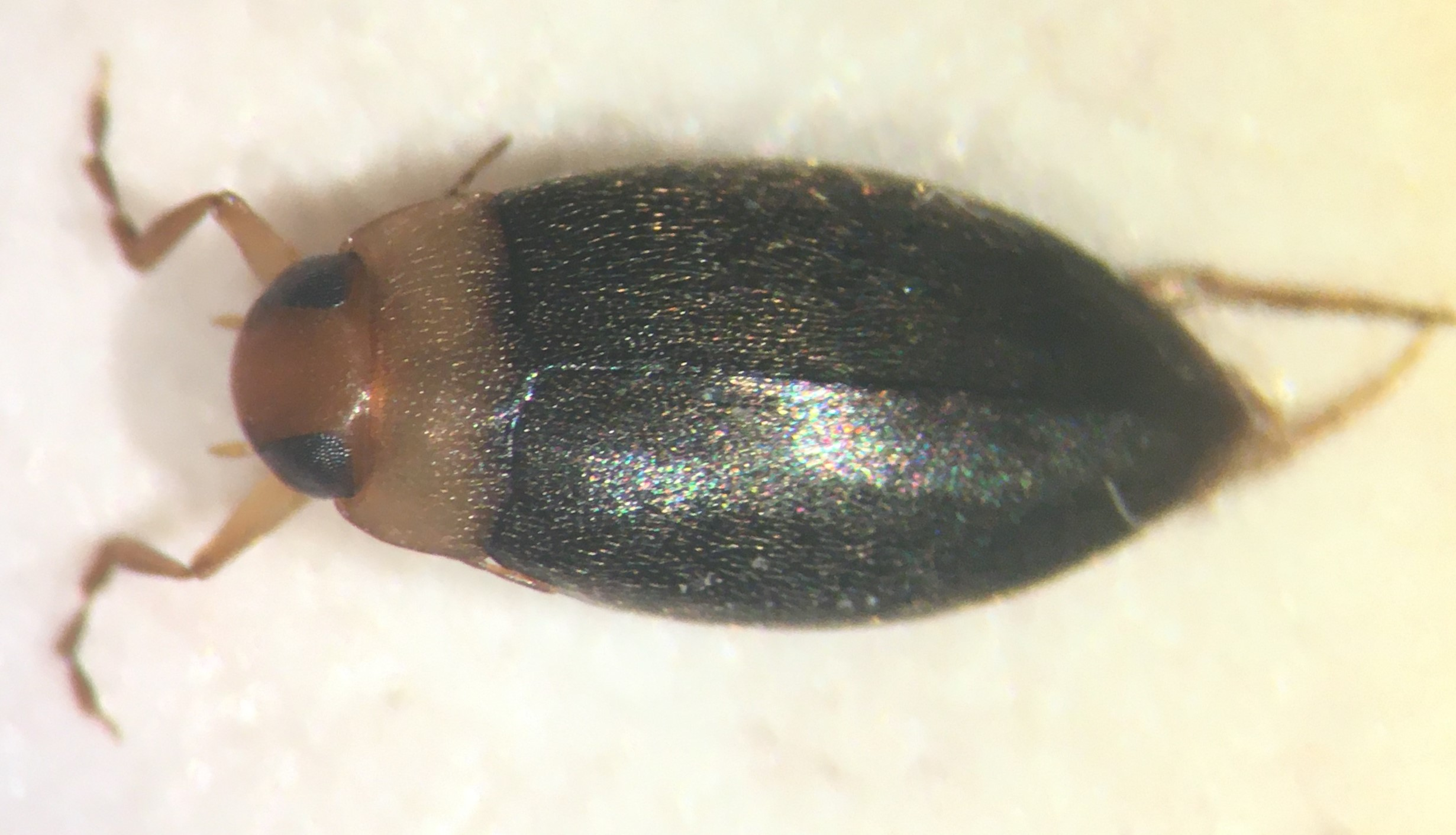

Scientific classification
- Domain: Eukaryota
- Kingdom: Animalia
- Phylum: Arthropoda
- Class: Insecta
- Order: Coleoptera
- Suborder: Adephaga
- Family: Dytiscidae
- Genus: Derovatellus
- Species: D. floridanus

Binomial name
- Derovatellus floridanus Fall, 1932

Synonyms
- Derovatellus ibarrai Spangler, 1966

= Derovatellus floridanus =

Species of beetle

Derovatellus floridanus is a species of predaceous diving beetle in the family Dytiscidae. It is found in North America.
