= Tepuidessus =

Scientific classification
- Domain: Eukaryota
- Kingdom: Animalia
- Phylum: Arthropoda
- Class: Insecta
- Order: Coleoptera
- Suborder: Adephaga
- Family: Dytiscidae
- Subfamily: Hydroporinae
- Tribe: Bidessini
- Genus: Tepuidessus; Spangler, 1981

Genus of beetles

Tepuidessus is a genus of diving beetles in the family Dytiscidae. There are at least two described species in Tepuidessus.

== Species ==
These two species belong to the genus Tepuidessus:

- Tepuidessus breweri Spangler, 1981 (South America)
- Tepuidessus grulai Kodada, Hendrich & Balke, 2018 (South America)
