= Clypeodytes dilutus =

Scientific classification
- Kingdom: Animalia
- Phylum: Arthropoda
- Class: Insecta
- Order: Coleoptera
- Suborder: Adephaga
- Family: Dytiscidae
- Genus: Clypeodytes
- Species: C. dilutus

Binomial name
- Clypeodytes dilutus (Sharp, 1882)

Synonyms
- Bidessus dilutus Sharp, 1882

Species of beetle

Clypeodytes dilutus is a species of predaceous diving beetle found in India, Sri Lanka, Thailand, and Vietnam.
