= Sinodytes =

Scientific classification
- Domain: Eukaryota
- Kingdom: Animalia
- Phylum: Arthropoda
- Class: Insecta
- Order: Coleoptera
- Suborder: Adephaga
- Family: Dytiscidae
- Subfamily: Hydroporinae
- Tribe: Bidessini
- Genus: Sinodytes; Spangler, 1996
- Species: S. hubbardi

Binomial name
- Sinodytes hubbardi Spangler, 1996

Genus of beetles

Sinodytes is a genus of predaceous diving beetles in the family Dytiscidae. This genus has a single species, Sinodytes hubbardi, found in southern Asia.
