= Rhithrodytes =

Scientific classification
- Domain: Eukaryota
- Kingdom: Animalia
- Phylum: Arthropoda
- Class: Insecta
- Order: Coleoptera
- Suborder: Adephaga
- Family: Dytiscidae
- Subfamily: Hydroporinae
- Genus: Rhithrodytes; Bameul, 1989

Genus of beetles

Rhithrodytes is a genus of beetles in the family Dytiscidae. It contains the following species:

- Rhithrodytes agnus Foster, 1992
- Rhithrodytes bimaculatus (Dufour, 1852)
- Rhithrodytes crux (Fabricius, 1792)
- Rhithrodytes dorsoplagiatus (Fairmaire, 1880)
- Rhithrodytes numidicus (Bedel, 1889)
- Rhithrodytes sexguttatus (Aubé, 1838)
