= Queda (beetle) =

Scientific classification
- Kingdom: Animalia
- Phylum: Arthropoda
- Class: Insecta
- Order: Coleoptera
- Suborder: Adephaga
- Family: Dytiscidae
- Subfamily: Hydroporinae
- Tribe: Hydrovatini
- Genus: Queda; Sharp, 1882

Genus of beetles

Queda is a genus of predaceous diving beetles in the family Dytiscidae. There are at least three described species in Queda, found in the Neotropics.

== Species ==
These three species belong to the genus Queda:

- Queda compressa Sharp, 1882 (the Neotropics)
- Queda hydrovatoides Zimmermann, 1921 (the Neotropics)
- Queda youngi Biström, 1990 (the Neotropics)
