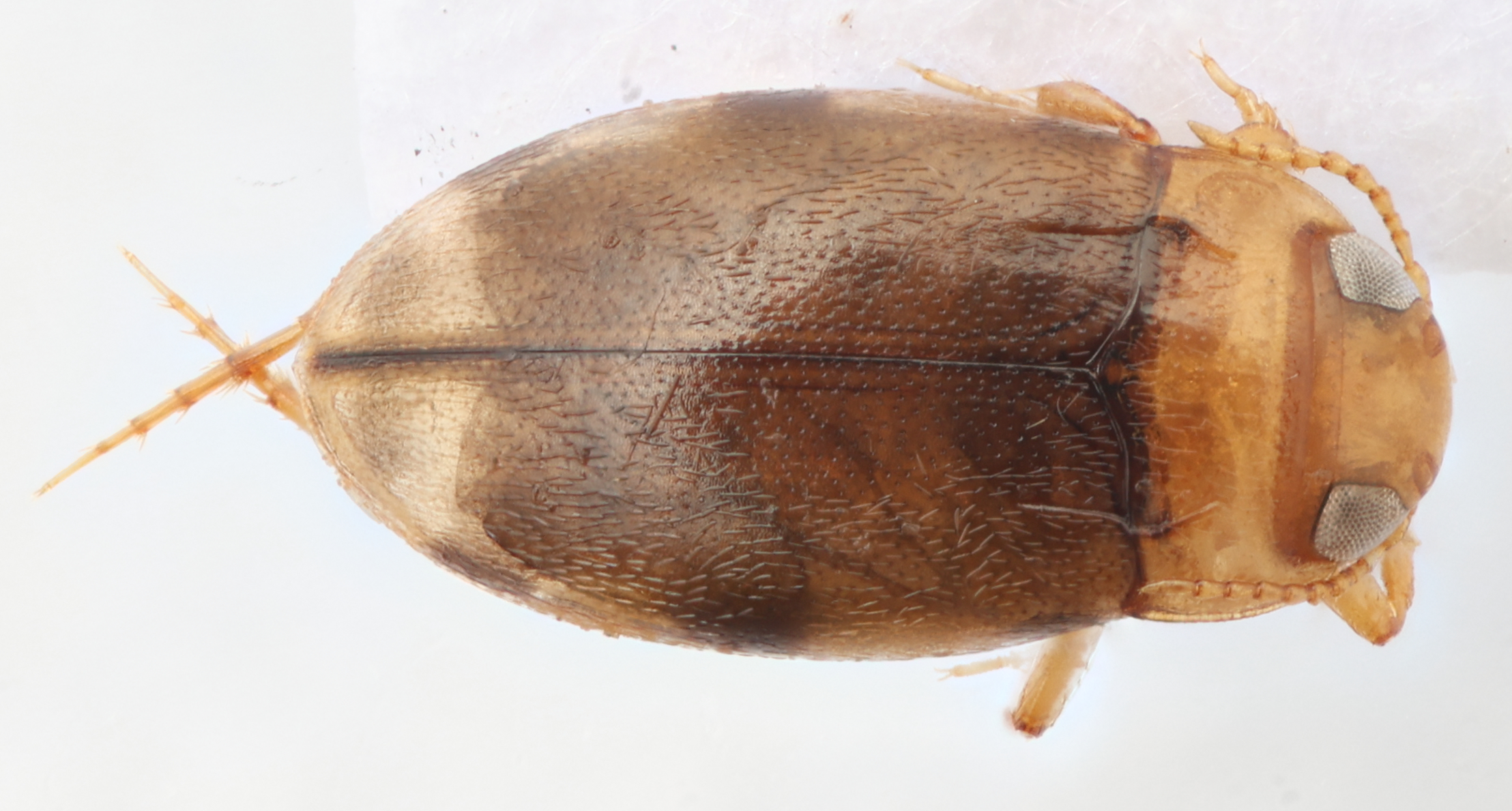

Scientific classification
- Kingdom: Animalia
- Phylum: Arthropoda
- Clade: Pancrustacea
- Class: Insecta
- Order: Coleoptera
- Suborder: Adephaga
- Family: Dytiscidae
- Tribe: Bidessini
- Genus: Bidessonotus; Régimbart, 1895

= Bidessonotus =

Genus of beetles

Bidessonotus is a genus of beetles in the family Dytiscidae, containing the following species:

- Bidessonotus annae K.B. Miller, 2016
- Bidessonotus bicolor Guignot, 1957
- Bidessonotus browneanus J.Balfour-Browne, 1947
- Bidessonotus canis K.B.Miller, 1997
- Bidessonotus caraibus (Chevrolat, 1863)
- Bidessonotus championi J.Balfour-Browne, 1947
- Bidessonotus dubius Young, 1990
- Bidessonotus fallax J.Balfour-Browne, 1947
- Bidessonotus inconspicuus (LeConte, 1855)
- Bidessonotus inigmaticus Young, 1990
- Bidessonotus josiahi K.B. Miller, 2016
- Bidessonotus longovalis (Blatchley, 1919)
- Bidessonotus melanocephalus Régimbart, 1895
- Bidessonotus mexicanus Régimbart, 1895
- Bidessonotus mobilis J.Balfour-Browne, 1947
- Bidessonotus morosus J.Balfour-Browne, 1947
- Bidessonotus nepotinus J.Balfour-Browne, 1947
- Bidessonotus obtusatus Régimbart, 1895
- Bidessonotus otrerus Young, 1990
- Bidessonotus palecephalus K.B. Miller, 2016
- Bidessonotus paludicolus Young, 1990
- Bidessonotus peregrinus J.Balfour-Browne, 1947
- Bidessonotus pictus Young, 1990
- Bidessonotus ploterus Young, 1990
- Bidessonotus pollostus Young, 1990
- Bidessonotus pulicarius (Aubé, 1838)
- Bidessonotus reductus K.B. Miller, 2016
- Bidessonotus regimbarti J.Balfour-Browne, 1947
- Bidessonotus rhampherens Young, 1990
- Bidessonotus rubellus Young, 1990
- Bidessonotus septimus K.B. Miller, 2016
- Bidessonotus spinosus K.B. Miller, 2016
- Bidessonotus tibialis Régimbart, 1895
- Bidessonotus truncatus J.Balfour-Browne, 1947
- Bidessonotus valdezi K.B. Miller, 2016
- Bidessonotus vicinus J.Balfour-Browne, 1947
