= Borneodessus =

Scientific classification
- Kingdom: Animalia
- Phylum: Arthropoda
- Class: Insecta
- Order: Coleoptera
- Suborder: Adephaga
- Family: Dytiscidae
- Tribe: Bidessini
- Genus: Borneodessus; Balke, Hendrich, Mazzoldi & Biström, 2002
- Species: B. zetteli

Binomial name
- Borneodessus zetteli Balke, Hendrich, Mazzoldi & Biström, 2002

Genus of beetles

Borneodessus zetteli is a species of beetles in the family Dytiscidae, the only species in the genus Borneodessus.
