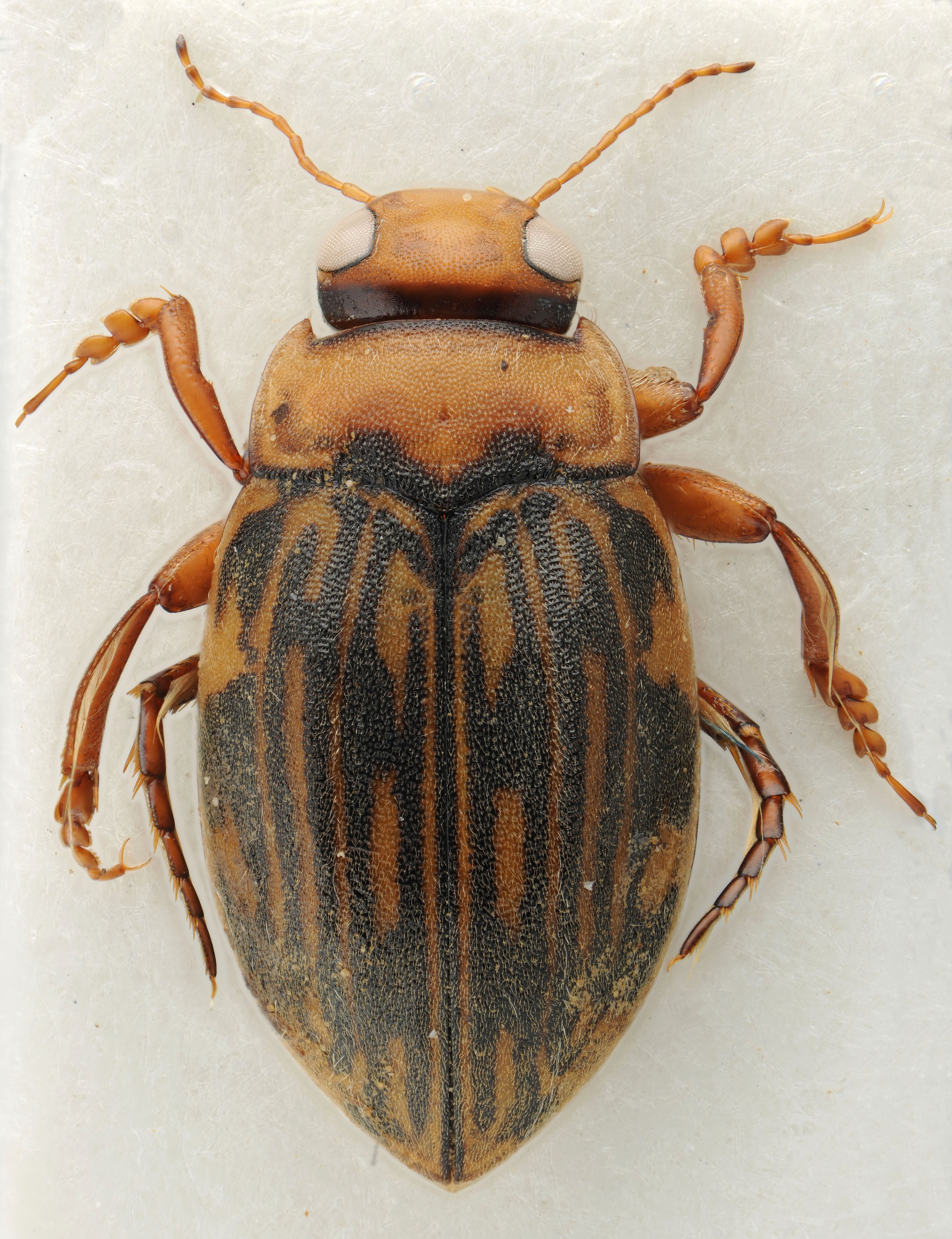
- Necterosoma penicillatum

Scientific classification
- Kingdom: Animalia
- Phylum: Arthropoda
- Class: Insecta
- Order: Coleoptera
- Suborder: Adephaga
- Family: Dytiscidae
- Genus: Necterosoma; W. J. Macleay, 1871

= Necterosoma =

Genus of beetles

Necterosoma is a genus of beetles in the family Dytiscidae, containing the following species:

- Necterosoma aphrodite Watts, 1978
- Necterosoma darwinii (Babington, 1841)
- Necterosoma dispar (Germar, 1848)
- Necterosoma novaecaledoniae J.Balfour-Browne, 1939
- Necterosoma penicillatum (Clark, 1862)
- Necterosoma regulare Sharp, 1882
- Necterosoma schmeltzi Sharp, 1882
- Necterosoma susanna Zwick, 1979
- Necterosoma theonathani Hendrich, 2003
- Necterosoma undecimlineatum (Babington, 1841)
