= Brachyvatus =

Scientific classification
- Kingdom: Animalia
- Phylum: Arthropoda
- Class: Insecta
- Order: Coleoptera
- Suborder: Adephaga
- Family: Dytiscidae
- Tribe: Bidessini
- Genus: Brachyvatus; Zimmermann, 1919

Genus of beetles

Brachyvatus is a genus of beetles in the family Dytiscidae, containing the following species:

- Brachyvatus acuminatus (Steinheil, 1869)
- Brachyvatus apicatus (Clark, 1862)
- Brachyvatus bituberculata (Guignot, 1958)
- Brachyvatus borrei (Sharp, 1882)
