= Lioporeus =

Scientific classification
- Kingdom: Animalia
- Phylum: Arthropoda
- Class: Insecta
- Order: Coleoptera
- Suborder: Adephaga
- Family: Dytiscidae
- Tribe: Hydroporini
- Genus: Lioporeus; Guignot, 1950

Genus of beetles

Lioporeus is a genus of beetles in the family Dytiscidae, containing the following species:

- Lioporeus pilatei (Fall, 1917)
- Lioporeus triangularis (Fall, 1917)
