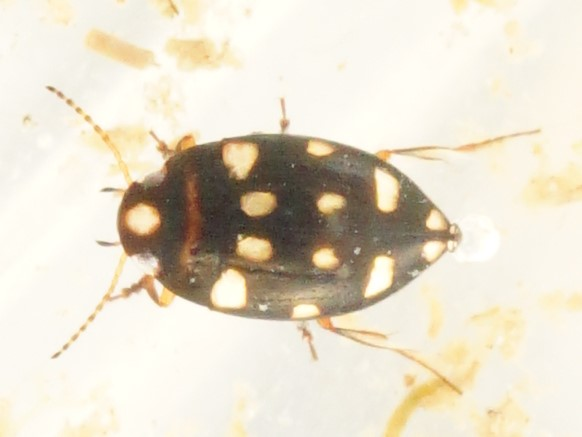
- Neonectes natrix

Scientific classification
- Domain: Eukaryota
- Kingdom: Animalia
- Phylum: Arthropoda
- Class: Insecta
- Order: Coleoptera
- Suborder: Adephaga
- Family: Dytiscidae
- Genus: Neonectes; J. Balfour-Browne, 1944

= Neonectes =

Genus of beetles

Neonectes is a genus of beetles in the family Dytiscidae, containing three species found in the Palaerctic, including China, Japan, the Korean Peninsula, and Russia:

- Neonectes babai Satô, 1990
- Neonectes jakovlevi (Zaitzev, 1905)
- Neonectes natrix (Sharp, 1884)
