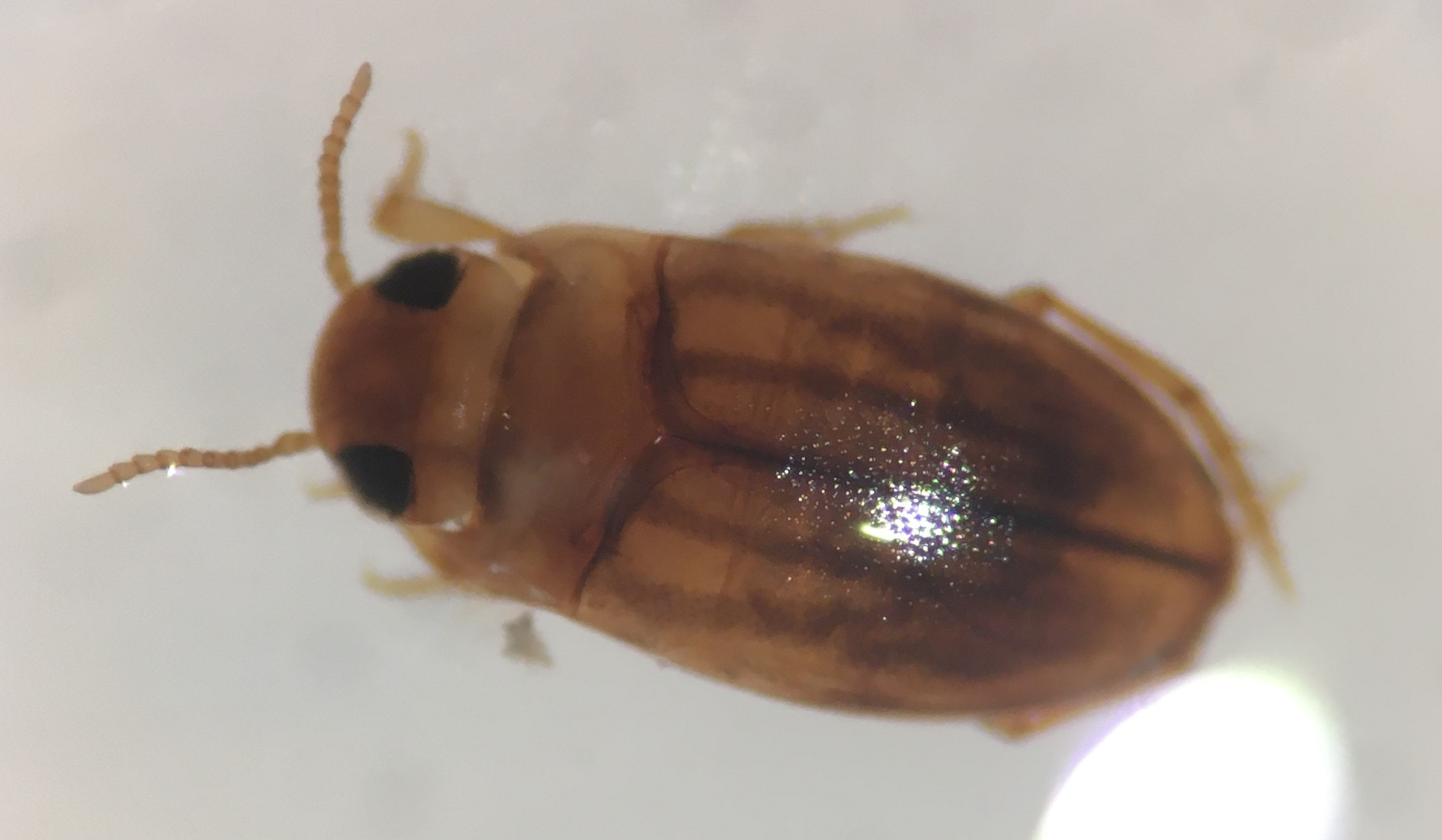

Scientific classification
- Kingdom: Animalia
- Phylum: Arthropoda
- Class: Insecta
- Order: Coleoptera
- Suborder: Adephaga
- Family: Dytiscidae
- Tribe: Bidessini
- Genus: Neobidessus; Young, 1967

= Neobidessus =

Genus of beetles

Neobidessus is a genus of beetles in the family Dytiscidae, containing the following species:

- Neobidessus alternatus (Régimbart, 1889)
- Neobidessus alvarengai Young, 1981
- Neobidessus atomus (Guignot, 1957)
- Neobidessus ayapel Young, 1981
- Neobidessus bokermanni Young, 1981
- Neobidessus bolivari Young, 1981
- Neobidessus bordoni Young, 1981
- Neobidessus confusus Young, 1981
- Neobidessus corumbensis (Zimmermann, 1921)
- Neobidessus curticornis (Régimbart, 1903)
- Neobidessus discoidalis (Sharp, 1882)
- Neobidessus hylaeus Young, 1977
- Neobidessus lilliputanus (Aubé, 1838)
- Neobidessus obtusoides Young, 1977
- Neobidessus obtusus (Sharp, 1882)
- Neobidessus persimilis (Régimbart, 1895)
- Neobidessus phyllisae Young, 1981
- Neobidessus pulloides Young, 1977
- Neobidessus pullus (LeConte, 1855)
- Neobidessus spangleri Young, 1977
- Neobidessus subvittatus (Zimmermann, 1921)
- Neobidessus surinamensis (Régimbart, 1889)
- Neobidessus tricorni Young, 1981
- Neobidessus trilineatus (Zimmermann, 1925)
- Neobidessus vittatipennis (Zimmermann, 1921)
- Neobidessus whitcombi Young, 1981
- Neobidessus woodruffi Young, 1981
- Neobidessus youngi (Leech, 1948)
