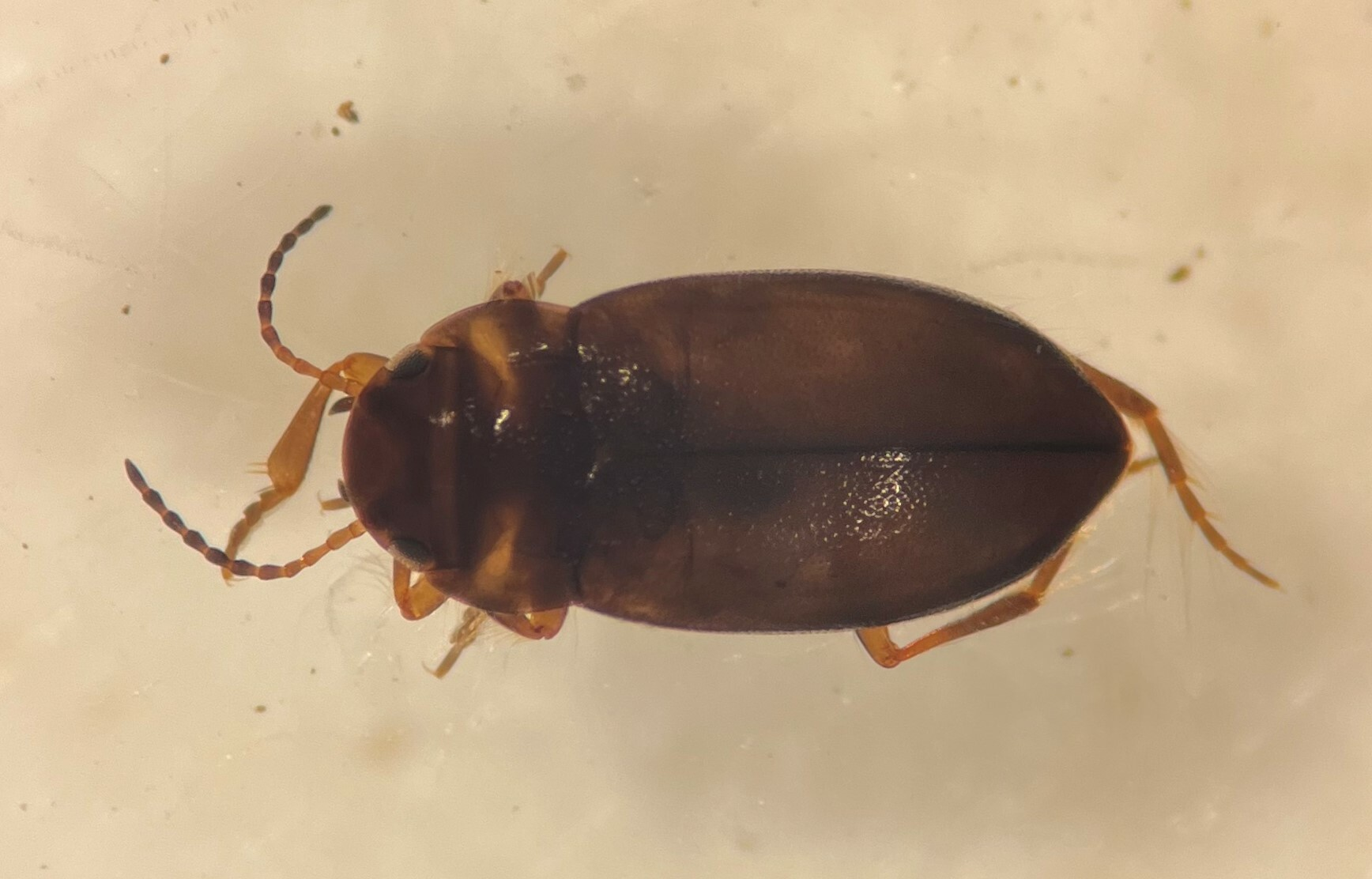
- In Texas, US

Scientific classification
- Kingdom: Animalia
- Phylum: Arthropoda
- Clade: Pancrustacea
- Class: Insecta
- Order: Coleoptera
- Suborder: Adephaga
- Family: Dytiscidae
- Tribe: Bidessini
- Genus: Crinodessus; K.B. Miller, 1997
- Species: C. amyae

Binomial name
- Crinodessus amyae K.B. Miller, 1997

= Crinodessus =

Crinodessus amyae

Genus of beetles

Crinodessus is a genus of predaceous diving beetles in the family Dytiscidae. It is monotypic, being represented by the single species, Crinodessus amyae, which has been found in Texas.
