= Anodocheilus =

Scientific classification
- Kingdom: Animalia
- Phylum: Arthropoda
- Class: Insecta
- Order: Coleoptera
- Suborder: Adephaga
- Family: Dytiscidae
- Tribe: Bidessini
- Genus: Anodocheilus; Babington, 1841

Genus of beetles

Anodocheilus is a genus of beetles in the family Dytiscidae, containing the following species:

- Anodocheilus bellitae Young, 1974
- Anodocheilus elenauerae Young, 1974
- Anodocheilus elizabethae Young, 1974
- Anodocheilus exiguus (Aubé, 1838)
- Anodocheilus florencae Young, 1974
- Anodocheilus francescae Young, 1974
- Anodocheilus germanus (Sharp, 1882)
- Anodocheilus guatemalensis (Zaitzev, 1910)
- Anodocheilus janae Young, 1974
- Anodocheilus lenorae Young, 1974
- Anodocheilus maculatus Babington, 1841
- Anodocheilus oramae Young, 1974
- Anodocheilus phyllisae Young, 1974
- Anodocheilus ruthae Young, 1974
- Anodocheilus sarae Young, 1974
- Anodocheilus silvestrii (Régimbart, 1903)
- Anodocheilus villae Young, 1974
- Anodocheilus virginiae Young, 1974
