= Kakadudessus =

Scientific classification
- Kingdom: Animalia
- Phylum: Arthropoda
- Class: Insecta
- Order: Coleoptera
- Suborder: Adephaga
- Family: Dytiscidae
- Tribe: Bidessini
- Genus: Kakadudessus; Hendrich & Balke, 2009
- Species: K. tomweiri

Binomial name
- Kakadudessus tomweiri Hendrich & Balke, 2009

Genus of beetles

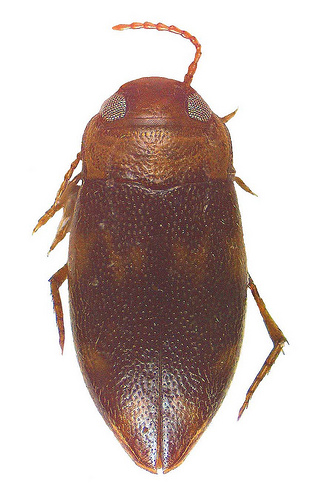
Habitus dorsal of Kakadudessus tomweiri

Kakadudessus is a genus of predaceous diving beetles in the family Dytiscidae. There is one described species in Kakadudessus, K. tomweiri, found in Australasia.
