= Trogloguignotus =

Scientific classification
- Domain: Eukaryota
- Kingdom: Animalia
- Phylum: Arthropoda
- Class: Insecta
- Order: Coleoptera
- Suborder: Adephaga
- Family: Dytiscidae
- Tribe: Bidessini
- Genus: Trogloguignotus; Sanfilippo, 1958
- Species: T. concii

Binomial name
- Trogloguignotus concii Sanfilippo, 1958

Genus of beetles

Trogloguignotus is a genus of predaceous diving beetles in the family Dytiscidae. This genus has a single species, Trogloguignotus concii, found in South America.
