= Sharphydrus =

Scientific classification
- Kingdom: Animalia
- Phylum: Arthropoda
- Class: Insecta
- Order: Coleoptera
- Suborder: Adephaga
- Family: Dytiscidae
- Genus: Sharphydrus; Omer-Cooper, 1958

Genus of beetles

Sharphydrus is a genus of beetles in the family Dytiscidae, containing the following species:

- Sharphydrus capensis (Omer-Cooper, 1955)
- Sharphydrus coriaceus (Régimbart, 1894)
