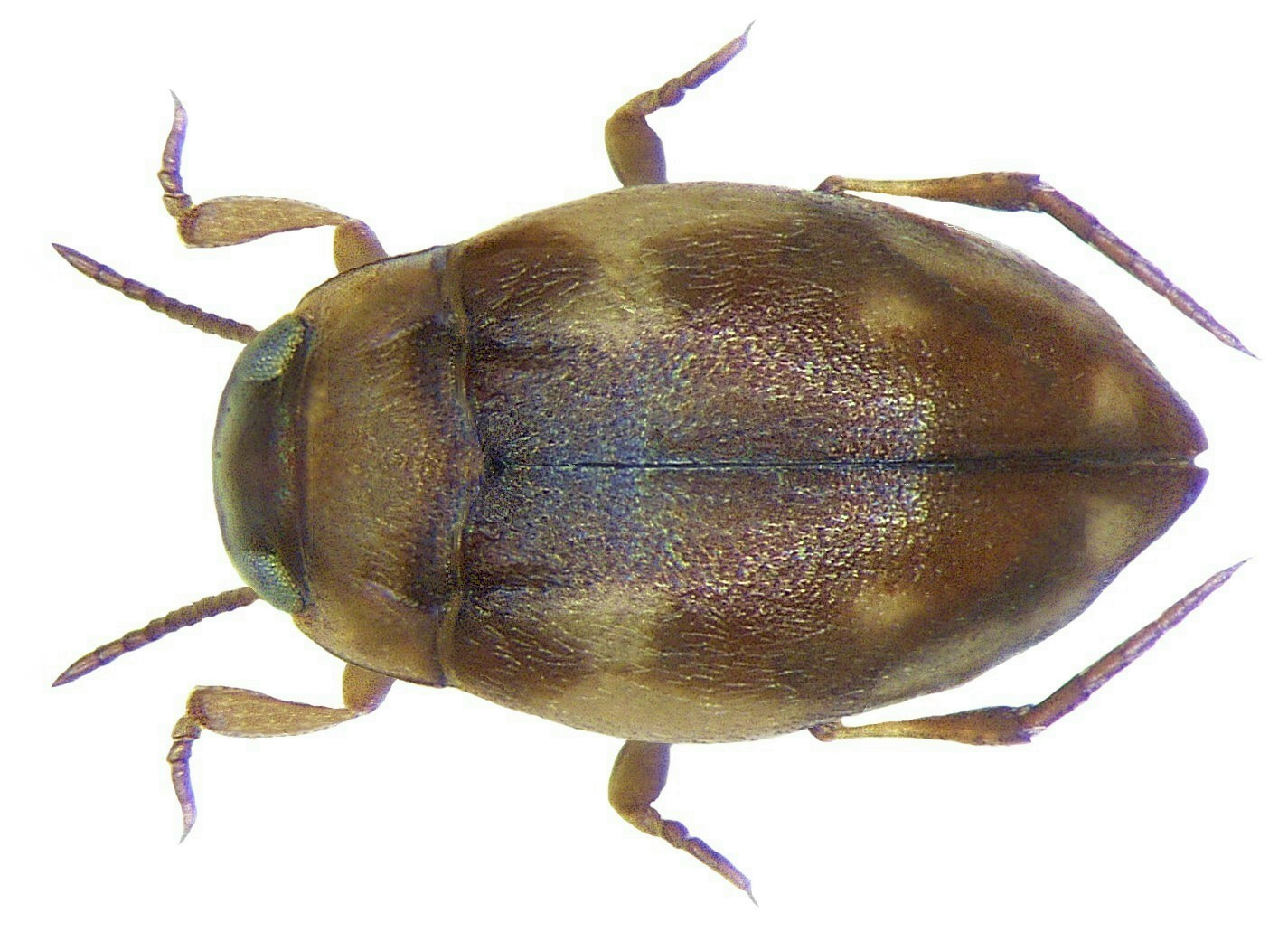
- Bidessus unistriatus (Schrank, 1781)

Scientific classification
- Kingdom: Animalia
- Phylum: Arthropoda
- Class: Insecta
- Order: Coleoptera
- Suborder: Adephaga
- Family: Dytiscidae
- Genus: Bidessus; Sharp, 1882

= Bidessus =

Genus of beetles

Bidessus is a genus of beetles in the family Dytiscidae, containing the following species:

- Bidessus alienus Zimmermann, 1919
- Bidessus anatolicus Wewalka, 1971
- Bidessus apicidens Biström & Sanfilippo, 1986
- Bidessus bertrandi Biström, 1988
- Bidessus cacozelus Omer-Cooper, 1931
- Bidessus calabricus Guignot, 1957
- Bidessus ceratus Guignot, 1941
- Bidessus complicatus Sharp, 1904
- Bidessus coxalis Sharp, 1882
- Bidessus cretensis Fery, 1992
- Bidessus decellei Biström, 1985
- Bidessus delicatulus (Schaum, 1844)
- Bidessus excavatus Biström, 1984
- Bidessus exornatus (Reiche & Saulcy, 1855)
- Bidessus fraudator Omer-Cooper, 1958
- Bidessus fulgidus Omer-Cooper, 1974
- Bidessus funebris Guignot, 1959
- Bidessus glabrescens Biström, 1983
- Bidessus goudotii (Laporte, 1835)
- Bidessus grossepunctatus Vorbringer, 1907
- Bidessus imitator Omer-Cooper, 1953
- Bidessus longistriga Régimbart, 1895
- Bidessus minutissimus (Germar, 1824)
- Bidessus muelleri Zimmermann, 1927
- Bidessus muluensis Omer-Cooper, 1931
- Bidessus mundulus Omer-Cooper, 1965
- Bidessus nasutus Sharp, 1887
- Bidessus nero Gschwendtner, 1933
- Bidessus nesioticus Guignot, 1956
- Bidessus occultus Sharp, 1882
- Bidessus omercooperae Biström, 1985
- Bidessus ovoideus Régimbart, 1895
- Bidessus perexiguus H.J.Kolbe, 1883
- Bidessus pergranulum Biström, 1985
- Bidessus perrinae Biström, 1985
- Bidessus perssoni Biström & Nilsson, 1990
- Bidessus pumilus (Aubé, 1838)
- Bidessus rossi Omer-Cooper, 1974
- Bidessus rothschildi Régimbart, 1907
- Bidessus ruandensis Omer-Cooper, 1974
- Bidessus saucius (Desbrochers des Loges, 1871)
- Bidessus seydeli Biström, 1985
- Bidessus sharpi Régimbart, 1895
- Bidessus sodalis Guignot, 1939
- Bidessus straeleni Omer-Cooper, 1974
- Bidessus toumodiensis Guignot, 1939
- Bidessus udus Biström, 1985
- Bidessus unistriatus (Goeze, 1777)
- Bidessus wilmoti Biström, 1985
