= Hemibidessus =

Scientific classification
- Kingdom: Animalia
- Phylum: Arthropoda
- Class: Insecta
- Order: Coleoptera
- Suborder: Adephaga
- Family: Dytiscidae
- Genus: Hemibidessus; Zimmermann, 1921

Genus of beetles

Hemibidessus is a genus of beetles in the family Dytiscidae, containing the following species:

- Hemibidessus bifasciatus (Zimmermann, 1921)
- Hemibidessus celinoides (Zimmermann, 1921)
- Hemibidessus conicus (Zimmermann, 1921)
- Hemibidessus plaumanni Gschwendtner, 1935
- Hemibidessus spangleri K.B.Miller, 2002
- Hemibidessus spiroductus K.B.Miller, 2002
