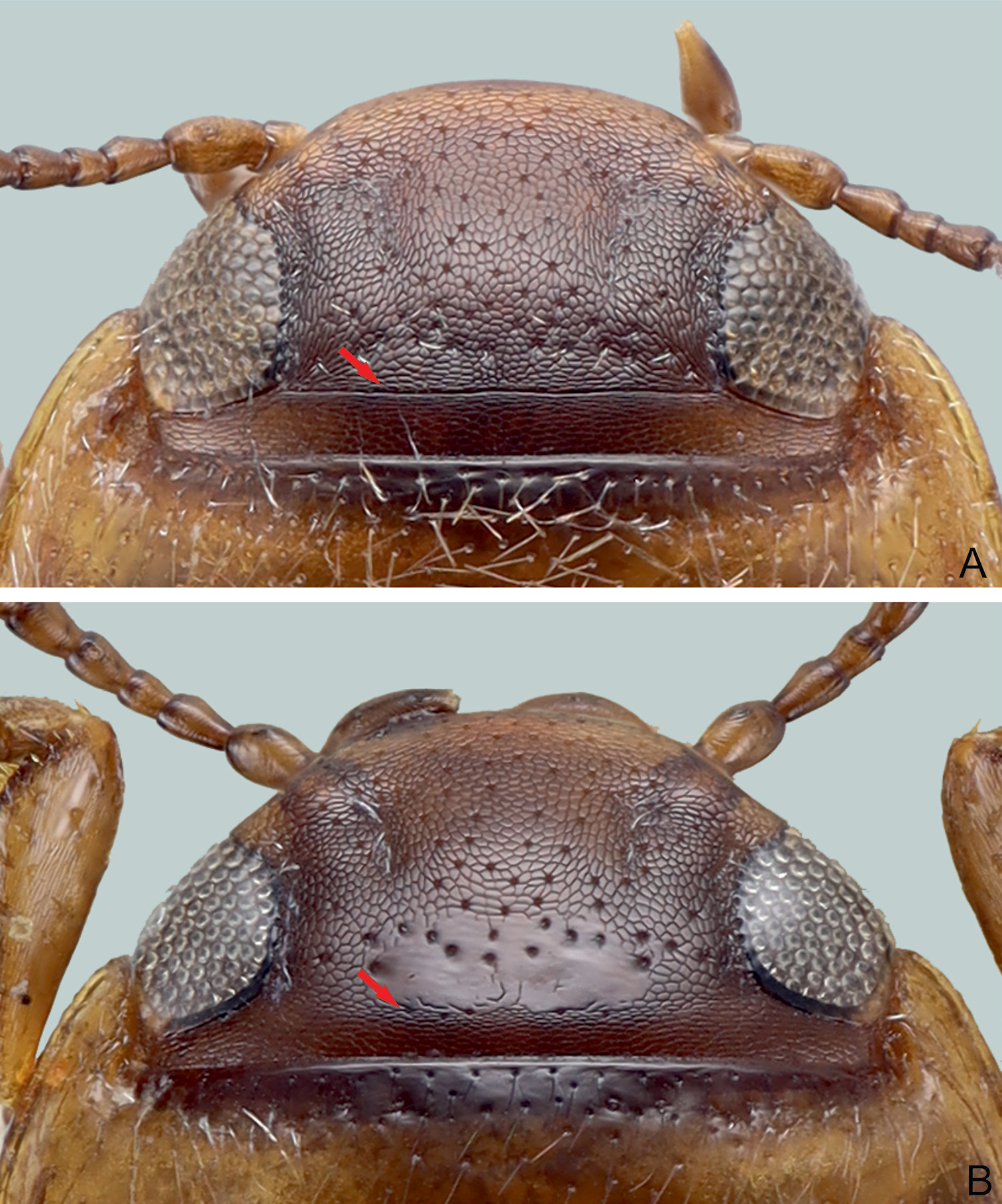

Scientific classification
- Kingdom: Animalia
- Phylum: Arthropoda
- Class: Insecta
- Order: Coleoptera
- Suborder: Adephaga
- Family: Dytiscidae
- Genus: Gibbidessus; Watts, 1978
- Species: G. chipi

Binomial name
- Gibbidessus chipi Watts, 1978

= Gibbidessus =

Gibbidessus chipi

Genus of beetles

Gibbidessus chipi is a species of beetle in the family Dytiscidae, the only species in the genus Gibbidessus.

The genus was first described in 1978 by Chris H.S. Watts.

It is found throughout Australia with the exceptions of the Northern Territory and Queensland.
