= Geodessus =

Scientific classification
- Kingdom: Animalia
- Phylum: Arthropoda
- Class: Insecta
- Order: Coleoptera
- Suborder: Adephaga
- Family: Dytiscidae
- Genus: Geodessus; Brancucci, 1979

Genus of beetles

Geodessus is a genus of beetles in the family Dytiscidae, containing the following species:

- Geodessus besucheti Brancucci, 1979
- Geodessus kejvali Balke & Hendrich, 1996
