= Hypodessus =

Scientific classification
- Kingdom: Animalia
- Phylum: Arthropoda
- Class: Insecta
- Order: Coleoptera
- Suborder: Adephaga
- Family: Dytiscidae
- Genus: Hypodessus; Guignot, 1939

Genus of beetles

Hypodessus is a genus of beetles in the family Dytiscidae, containing the following species:

- Hypodessus cruciatus (Régimbart, 1903)
- Hypodessus crucifer Guignot, 1939
- Hypodessus curvilineatus (Zimmermann, 1921)
- Hypodessus dasythrix Guignot, 1954
- Hypodessus frustrator Spangler, 1966
- Hypodessus titschacki (Gschwendtner, 1954)
