= Africodytes =

Scientific classification
- Kingdom: Animalia
- Phylum: Arthropoda
- Class: Insecta
- Order: Coleoptera
- Suborder: Adephaga
- Family: Dytiscidae
- Genus: Africodytes; Biström, 1988

Genus of beetles

Africodytes is a genus of beetles in the family Dytiscidae, containing the following species:

- Africodytes kongouensis Bilardo & Rocchi, 1999
- Africodytes maximus Biström, 1995
- Africodytes rubromaculatus Biström, 1988
- Africodytes silvestris (Bilardo & Pederzani, 1978)
