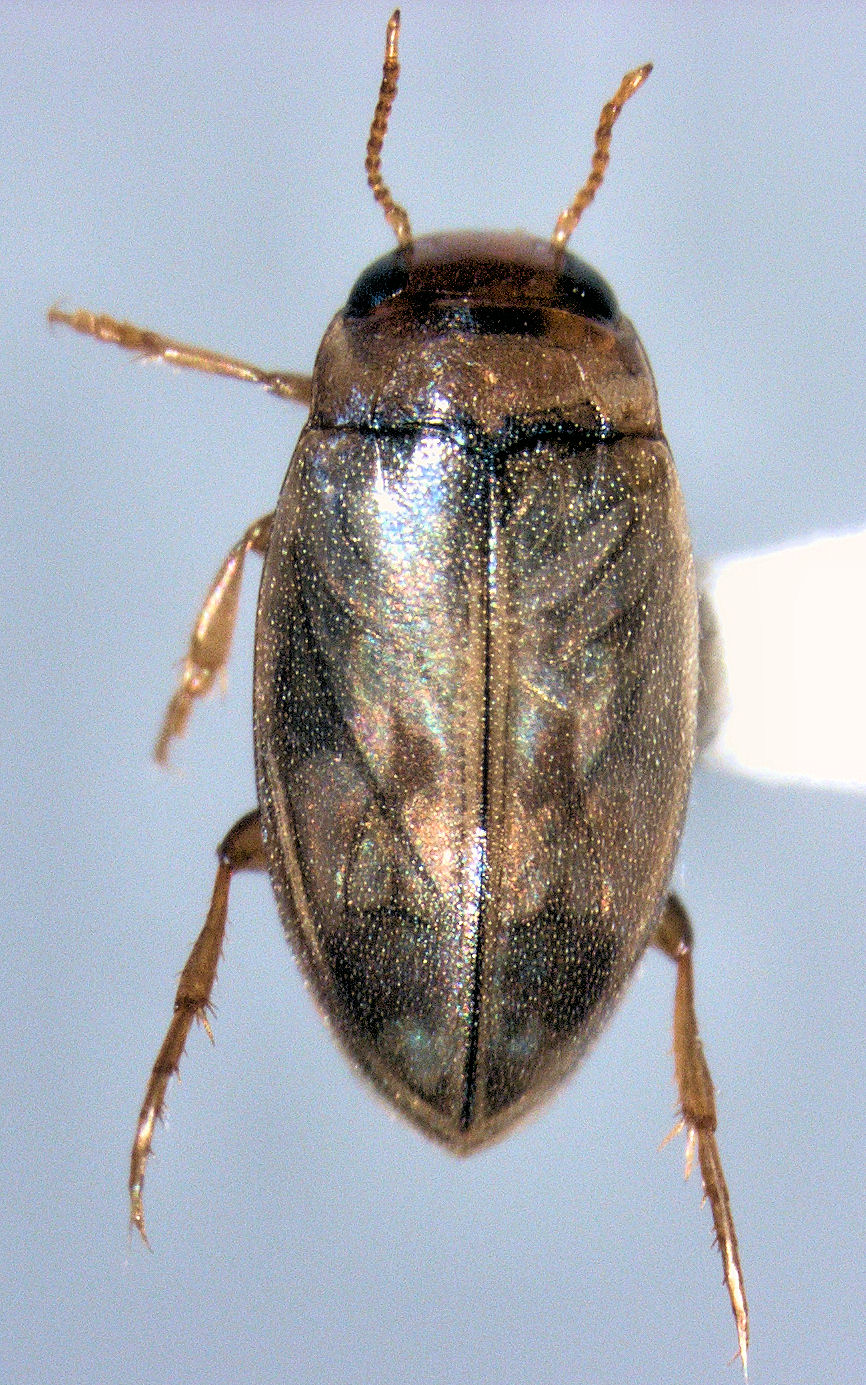
- Allodessus bistrigatus

Scientific classification
- Kingdom: Animalia
- Phylum: Arthropoda
- Class: Insecta
- Order: Coleoptera
- Suborder: Adephaga
- Family: Dytiscidae
- Genus: Allodessus; Guignot, 1953

= Allodessus =

Genus of beetles

Allodessus is a genus of beetles in the family Dytiscidae, containing the following species:

- Allodessus bistrigatus (Clark, 1862)
- Allodessus megacephalus (Gschwendtner, 1931)
- Allodessus oliveri (Ordish, 1966)
- Allodessus skottsbergi (Zimmermann, 1924)
- Allodessus thienemanni (Csiki, 1938)
