= Amarodytes =

Scientific classification
- Kingdom: Animalia
- Phylum: Arthropoda
- Class: Insecta
- Order: Coleoptera
- Suborder: Adephaga
- Family: Dytiscidae
- Genus: Amarodytes; Régimbart, 1900

Genus of beetles

Amarodytes is a genus of beetles in the family Dytiscidae, containing the following species:

- Amarodytes boggianii Régimbart, 1900
- Amarodytes duponti (Aubé, 1838)
- Amarodytes guidi Guignot, 1957
- Amarodytes oberthueri Régimbart, 1900
- Amarodytes percosioides Régimbart, 1900
- Amarodytes plaumanni Gschwendtner, 1935
- Amarodytes pulchellus Guignot, 1955
- Amarodytes segrix Guignot, 1950
- Amarodytes testaceopictus Régimbart, 1900
- Amarodytes undulatus Gschwendtner, 1954
