= Clypeodytes =

Scientific classification
- Kingdom: Animalia
- Phylum: Arthropoda
- Class: Insecta
- Order: Coleoptera
- Suborder: Adephaga
- Family: Dytiscidae
- Genus: Clypeodytes; Régimbart, 1894

Genus of beetles

Clypeodytes is a genus of beetles in the family Dytiscidae, containing the following species:

- Clypeodytes ater Bilardo & Rocchi, 1990
- Clypeodytes bedeli Régimbart, 1895
- Clypeodytes bicornis Bilardo & Pederzani, 1978
- Clypeodytes bufo (Sharp, 1890)
- Clypeodytes concivis Guignot, 1955
- Clypeodytes cribrosus (Schaum, 1864)
- Clypeodytes darlingtoni Watts, 1978
- Clypeodytes densepunctatus Biström, 1988
- Clypeodytes dilutus (Sharp, 1882)
- Clypeodytes divoi Biström, 1988
- Clypeodytes duodecimmaculatus Régimbart, 1899
- Clypeodytes eboris Biström, 1988
- Clypeodytes fartilis Guignot, 1951
- Clypeodytes feryi Hendrich & Wang, 2006
- Clypeodytes flexuosus Biström, 1988
- Clypeodytes gestroi (Régimbart, 1888)
- Clypeodytes hemani Vazirani, 1968
- Clypeodytes insularis Guignot, 1956
- Clypeodytes jaechi Wewalka & Biström, 1987
- Clypeodytes larsoni Hendrich & Wang, 2006
- Clypeodytes lentus Sharp, 1904
- Clypeodytes loriae (Régimbart, 1892)
- Clypeodytes meridionalis Régimbart, 1895
- Clypeodytes migrator (Sharp, 1882)
- Clypeodytes perlautus Biström, 1988
- Clypeodytes pertusus Guignot, 1950
- Clypeodytes procerus Omer-Cooper, 1959
- Clypeodytes proditus Guignot, 1942
- Clypeodytes pseudolentus Biström, 1988
- Clypeodytes roeri Biström, 1988
- Clypeodytes severini (Régimbart, 1892)
- Clypeodytes simplex Guignot, 1936
- Clypeodytes sordidipennis Régimbart, 1903
- Clypeodytes spangleri Biström, 1988
- Clypeodytes submarginatus Biström, 1988
- Clypeodytes viator Biström, 1988
- Clypeodytes weberi Biström, 1988
- Clypeodytes weiri Hendrich & Wang, 2006
