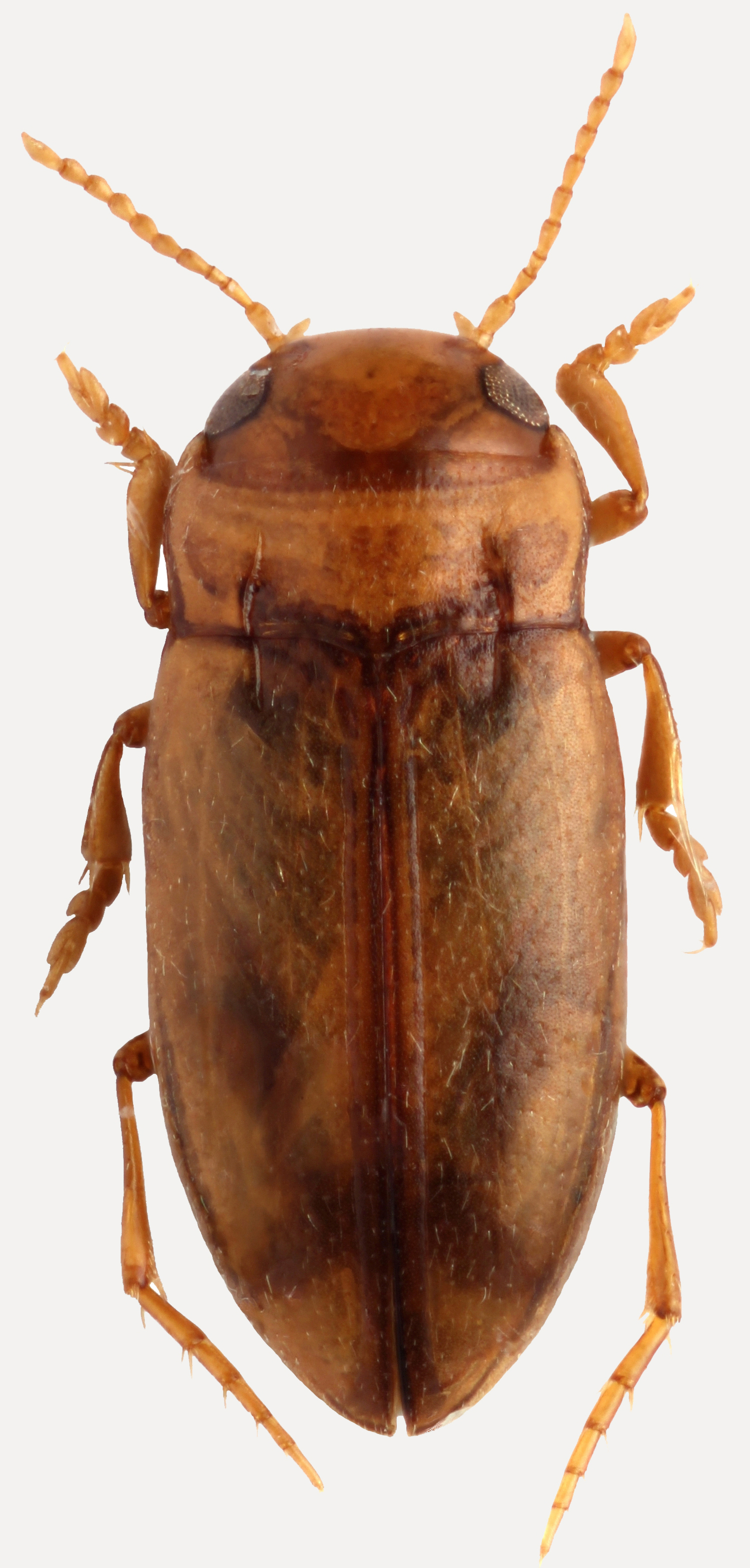
- Glareadessus stocki

Scientific classification
- Kingdom: Animalia
- Phylum: Arthropoda
- Class: Insecta
- Order: Coleoptera
- Suborder: Adephaga
- Family: Dytiscidae
- Genus: Glareadessus; Wewalka & Biström, 1998

= Glareadessus =

Genus of beetles

Glareadessus is a genus of beetles in the family Dytiscidae, containing the following species:

- Glareadessus franzi Wewalka & Biström, 1998
- Glareadessus stocki Wewalka & Biström, 1998
