= Platydytes =

Scientific classification
- Kingdom: Animalia
- Phylum: Arthropoda
- Class: Insecta
- Order: Coleoptera
- Suborder: Adephaga
- Family: Dytiscidae
- Genus: Platydytes; Biström, 1988

Genus of beetles

Platydytes is a genus of beetles in the family Dytiscidae, containing the following species:

- Platydytes coarctaticollis (Régimbart, 1894)
- Platydytes cooperae Biström, 1988
- Platydytes incognitus Biström, 1988
- Platydytes inspectatus (Omer-Cooper, 1959)
