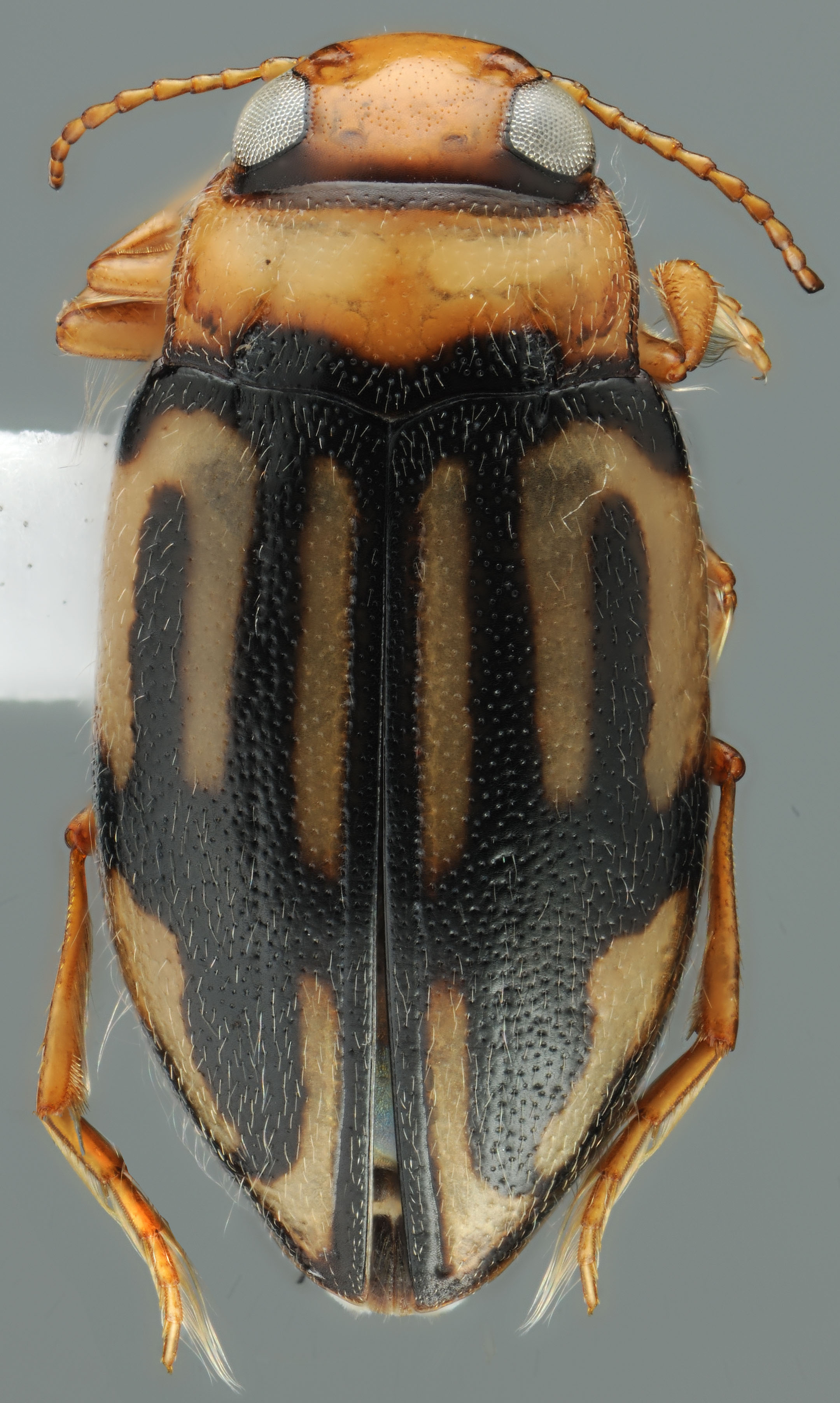

Scientific classification
- Kingdom: Animalia
- Phylum: Arthropoda
- Class: Insecta
- Order: Coleoptera
- Suborder: Adephaga
- Family: Dytiscidae
- Genus: Papuadessus; Balke, 2001
- Species: P. pakdjoko

Binomial name
- Papuadessus pakdjoko Balke, 2001

= Papuadessus =

Papuadessus pakdjoko

Genus of beetles

Papuadessus pakdjoko is a species of beetle in the family Dytiscidae, the only species in the genus Papuadessus.
