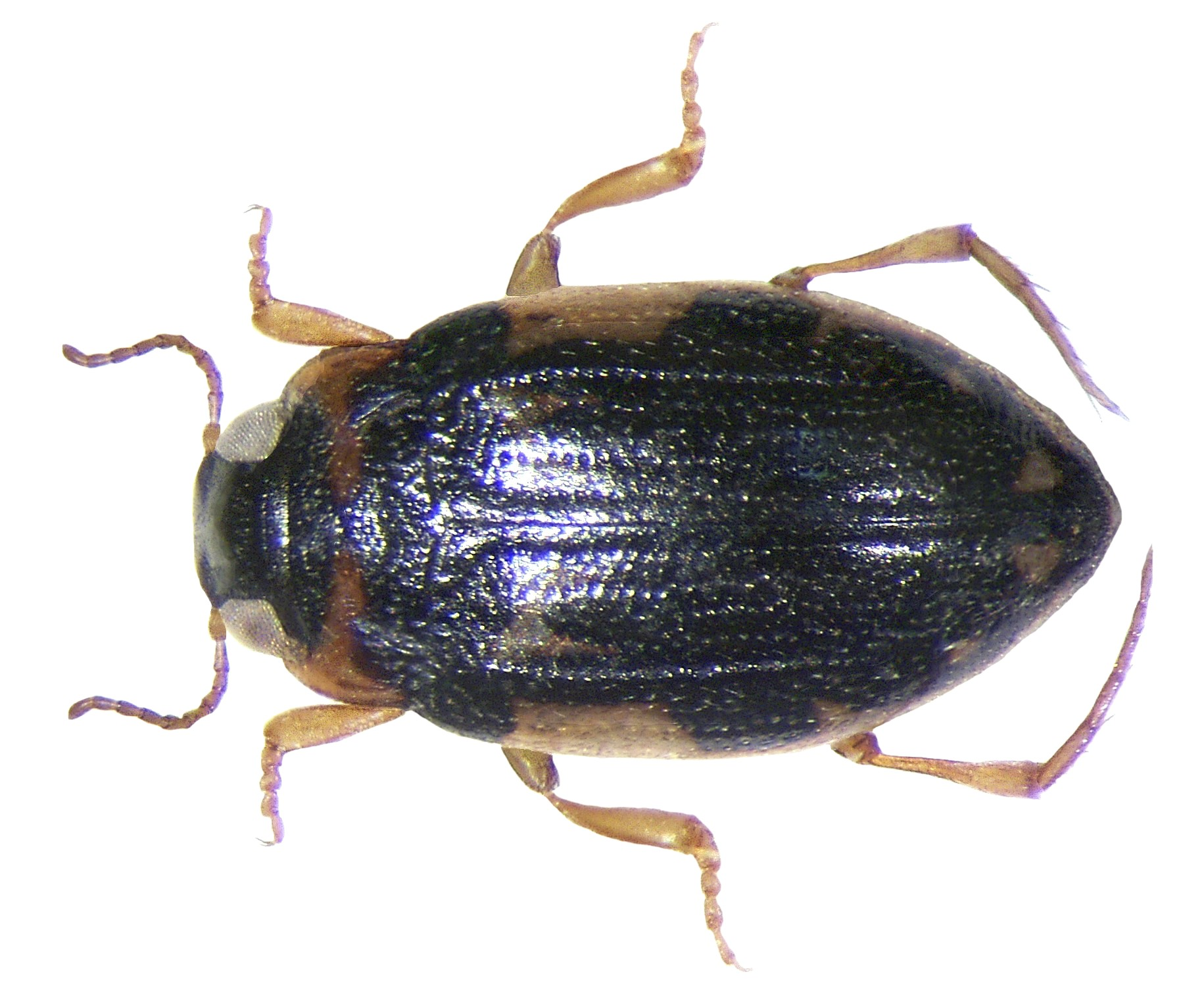
- Yolina elegantula

Scientific classification
- Kingdom: Animalia
- Phylum: Arthropoda
- Class: Insecta
- Order: Coleoptera
- Suborder: Adephaga
- Family: Dytiscidae
- Genus: Yolina; Guignot, 1936

= Yolina =

Genus of beetles

Yolina is a genus of beetles in the family Dytiscidae, containing the following species:

- Yolina baerti Biström, 1983
- Yolina balfourbrownei Biström, 1988
- Yolina brincki (Omer-Cooper, 1965)
- Yolina chopardi (Guignot, 1950)
- Yolina elegantula (Boheman, 1848)
- Yolina inopinata (Omer-Cooper, 1955)
- Yolina insignis (Sharp, 1882)
- Yolina kongouensis Bilardo & Rocchi, 1999
- Yolina libera Biström, 1987
- Yolina royi Biström, 1983
- Yolina sima (Omer-Cooper, 1965)
- Yolina wewalkai Biström, 1983
