= Pachynectes =

Scientific classification
- Kingdom: Animalia
- Phylum: Arthropoda
- Class: Insecta
- Order: Coleoptera
- Suborder: Adephaga
- Family: Dytiscidae
- Genus: Pachynectes; Régimbart, 1903

Genus of beetles

Pachynectes is a genus of beetles in the family Dytiscidae, containing the following species:

- Pachynectes costulifer (Régimbart, 1903)
- Pachynectes hygrotoides (Régimbart, 1895)
- Pachynectes mendax Guignot, 1960
