= Pseuduvarus =

Scientific classification
- Domain: Eukaryota
- Kingdom: Animalia
- Phylum: Arthropoda
- Class: Insecta
- Order: Coleoptera
- Suborder: Adephaga
- Family: Dytiscidae
- Genus: Pseuduvarus; Biström, 1988

Genus of beetles

Pseuduvarus is a genus of beetles in the family Dytiscidae, containing the following species:

- Pseuduvarus secundus Bilardo & Rocchi, 2002
- Pseuduvarus vitticollis (Boheman, 1848)
