= Comaldessus =

Comaldessus stygius

Scientific classification
- Kingdom: Animalia
- Phylum: Arthropoda
- Class: Insecta
- Order: Coleoptera
- Suborder: Adephaga
- Family: Dytiscidae
- Genus: Comaldessus; Spangler & Barr, 1995
- Species: C. stygius

Binomial name
- Comaldessus stygius Spangler & Barr, 1995

Genus of beetles

Comaldessus stygius is a species of beetles in the family Dytiscidae, the only species in the genus Comaldessus.
