= Tyndallhydrus =

Tyndallhydrus caraboides

Scientific classification
- Kingdom: Animalia
- Phylum: Arthropoda
- Class: Insecta
- Order: Coleoptera
- Suborder: Adephaga
- Family: Dytiscidae
- Genus: Tyndallhydrus; Sharp, 1882
- Species: T. caraboides

Binomial name
- Tyndallhydrus caraboides Sharp, 1882

Genus of beetles

Tyndallhydrus caraboides is a species of beetle in the family Dytiscidae, the only species in the genus Tyndallhydrus.
