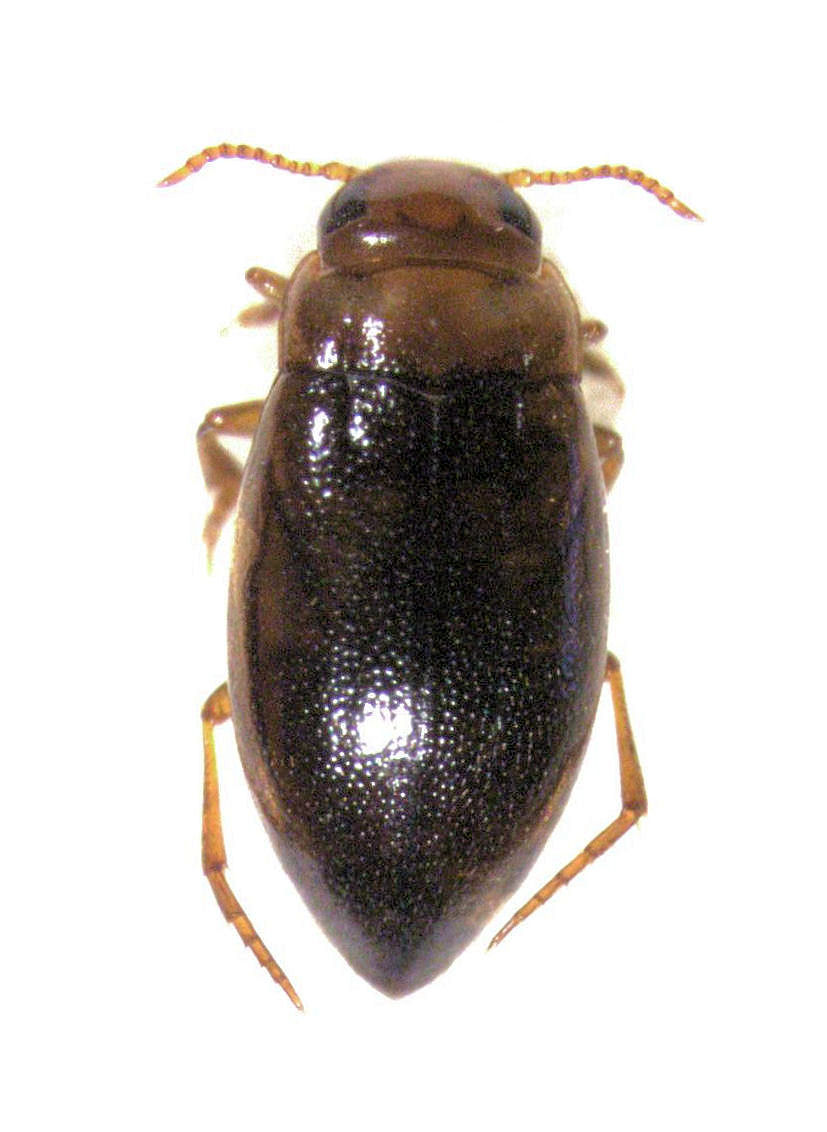
- adult Liodessus plicatus.

Scientific classification
- Domain: Eukaryota
- Kingdom: Animalia
- Phylum: Arthropoda
- Class: Insecta
- Order: Coleoptera
- Suborder: Adephaga
- Family: Dytiscidae
- Subfamily: Hydroporinae; Aubé, 1836

= Hydroporinae =

Subfamily of beetles

Hydroporinae is a subfamily of predaceous diving beetles in the family Dytiscidae. There are at least 2,200 described species in Hydroporinae.

== See also ==
- List of Hydroporinae genera
