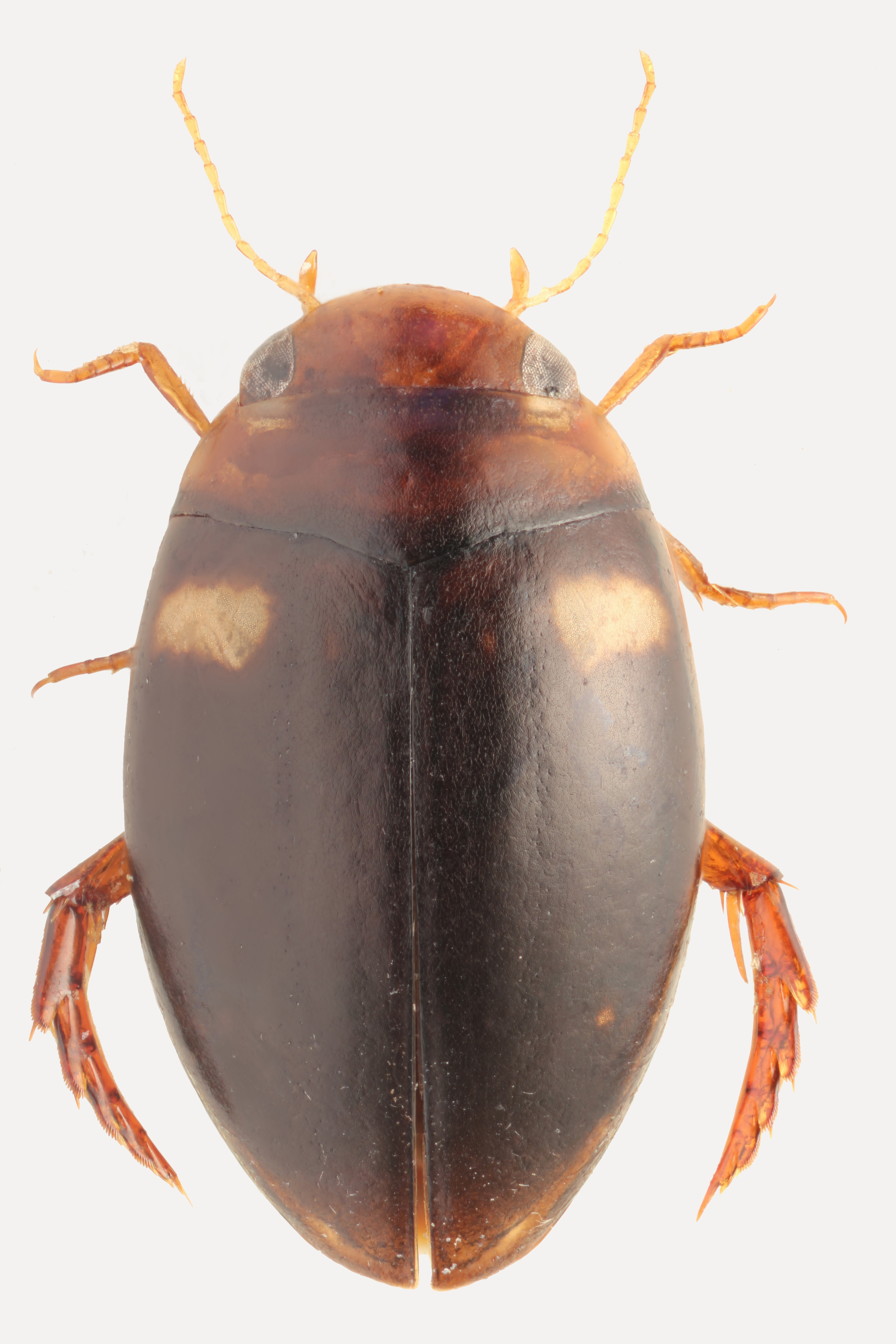
- Laccophilus maindroni

Scientific classification
- Domain: Eukaryota
- Kingdom: Animalia
- Phylum: Arthropoda
- Class: Insecta
- Order: Coleoptera
- Suborder: Adephaga
- Family: Dytiscidae
- Subfamily: Laccophilinae; Gistel, 1856

= Laccophilinae =

Subfamily of beetles

Laccophilinae is a subfamily of ground and water beetles in the family Dytiscidae. There are at least 410 described species in Laccophilinae.

== Genera ==
- Africophilus Guignot, 1948
- Agabetes Crotch, 1873
- Australphilus Watts, 1978
- Japanolaccophilus Satô, 1972
- Laccodytes Régimbart, 1895
- Laccophilus Leach, 1815
- Laccoporus J. Balfour-Browne, 1939
- Laccosternus Brancucci, 1983
- Napodytes Steiner, 1981
- Neptosternus Sharp, 1882
- Philaccolilus Guignot, 1937
- Philaccolus Guignot, 1937
- Philodytes J. Balfour-Browne, 1939
