= Rugosus =

Scientific classification
- Kingdom: Animalia
- Phylum: Arthropoda
- Class: Insecta
- Order: Coleoptera
- Suborder: Adephaga
- Family: Dytiscidae
- Genus: Rugosus; García, 2001

Genus of beetles

Rugosus is a genus of beetles in the family Dytiscidae, containing the following species:

- Rugosus emarginatus García, 2001
- Rugosus pubis García, 2001
