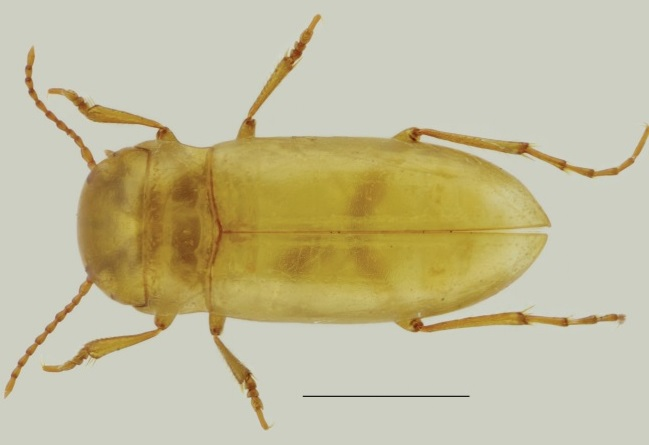
- Iberoporus pluto

Scientific classification
- Domain: Eukaryota
- Kingdom: Animalia
- Phylum: Arthropoda
- Class: Insecta
- Order: Coleoptera
- Suborder: Adephaga
- Family: Dytiscidae
- Genus: Iberoporus; Castro & Delgado, 2001

Species
- Iberoporus cermenius Iberoporus pluto

= Iberoporus =

Genus of beetles

Iberoporus is a genus of beetles in the family Dytiscidae, the only two known species in the genus, Iberoporus cermenius and Iberoporus pluto are endemic to the Iberian Peninsula.
