= Methles =

Scientific classification
- Kingdom: Animalia
- Phylum: Arthropoda
- Class: Insecta
- Order: Coleoptera
- Suborder: Adephaga
- Family: Dytiscidae
- Genus: Methles; Sharp, 1882

Genus of beetles

Methles is a genus of beetles in the family Dytiscidae, containing the following species:

- Methles caucasicus Riha, 1974
- Methles cribratellus (Fairmaire, 1880)
- Methles freyi Guignot, 1953
- Methles indicus Régimbart, 1899
- Methles laevis Zimmermann, 1933
- Methles punctatissimus Gschwendtner, 1943
- Methles rectus Sharp, 1882
- Methles spinosus Sharp, 1882
