= Stygoporus =

Stygoporus oregonensis

Scientific classification
- Kingdom: Animalia
- Phylum: Arthropoda
- Class: Insecta
- Order: Coleoptera
- Suborder: Adephaga
- Family: Dytiscidae
- Genus: Stygoporus; Larson & LaBonte, 1994
- Species: S. oregonensis

Binomial name
- Stygoporus oregonensis Larson & LaBonte, 1994

Genus of beetles

Stygoporus oregonensis is a species of beetle in the family Dytiscidae, the only species in the genus Stygoporus.

They were first identified in an Oregon bathroom in 1984. Eight specimens were collected by Oregon State University before the bathroom was bleached. There have been no reported specimens found until 2014 to 2016.
