= Spencerhydrus =

Scientific classification
- Kingdom: Animalia
- Phylum: Arthropoda
- Class: Insecta
- Order: Coleoptera
- Suborder: Adephaga
- Family: Dytiscidae
- Subfamily: Cybistrinae
- Genus: Spencerhydrus; Sharp, 1882

Genus of beetles

Spencerhydrus is a genus of beetles in the family Dytiscidae. The genus is found only in southern Australia and contains the following two species:

- Spencerhydrus latecinctus Sharp, 1882
- Spencerhydrus pulchellus Sharp, 1882
