= Pteroporus =

Pteroporus antiquus

Scientific classification
- Kingdom: Animalia
- Phylum: Arthropoda
- Class: Insecta
- Order: Coleoptera
- Suborder: Adephaga
- Family: Dytiscidae
- Genus: Pteroporus; Guignot, 1933
- Species: P. antiquus

Binomial name
- Pteroporus antiquus (Heer, 1862)

Genus of beetles

Pteroporus antiquus is a species of beetle in the family Dytiscidae, the only species in the genus Pteroporus.
