= Ereboporus =

Scientific classification
- Domain: Eukaryota
- Kingdom: Animalia
- Phylum: Arthropoda
- Class: Insecta
- Order: Coleoptera
- Suborder: Adephaga
- Family: Dytiscidae
- Tribe: Hydroporini
- Genus: Ereboporus; K.B. Miller, Gibson & Alarie, 2009
- Species: E. naturaconservatus

Binomial name
- Ereboporus naturaconservatus K.B. Miller, Gibson & Alarie, 2009

Genus of beetles

Ereboporus is a genus of predaceous diving beetles in the family Dytiscidae. There is one described species in Ereboporus, E. naturaconservatus, found in North America.
