= Sinoporus =

Sinoporus Temporal range: Barremian–Aptian

Scientific classification
- Domain: Eukaryota
- Kingdom: Animalia
- Phylum: Arthropoda
- Class: Insecta
- Order: Coleoptera
- Suborder: Adephaga
- Family: Dytiscidae
- Subfamily: incertae sedis
- Genus: Sinoporus; Prokin & Ren, 2010
- Species: S. lineatus

Binomial name
- Sinoporus lineatus Prokin & Ren, 2010

Genus of beetles

Sinoporus is an extinct genus of predaceous diving beetles in the family Dytiscidae. There is one described species in Sinoporus, S. lineatus.
