= Notaticus =

Scientific classification
- Kingdom: Animalia
- Phylum: Arthropoda
- Clade: Pancrustacea
- Class: Insecta
- Order: Coleoptera
- Suborder: Adephaga
- Family: Dytiscidae
- Genus: Notaticus; Zimmermann, 1928

Genus of beetles

Notaticus is a genus of beetles in the family Dytiscidae and the only genus in the tribe Aubehydrini. The genus is distributed in the lowland tropical areas of South America from Venezuela to Bolivia. The genus contains these two species:

- Notaticus fasciatus Zimmermann, 1928
- Notaticus obscurus García & Navarro, 2001
