= Vatellus =

Scientific classification
- Kingdom: Animalia
- Phylum: Arthropoda
- Class: Insecta
- Order: Coleoptera
- Suborder: Adephaga
- Family: Dytiscidae
- Genus: Vatellus; Aubé, 1837

Genus of beetles

Vatellus is a genus of beetles in the family Dytiscidae, containing the following species:

- Vatellus amae K.B.Miller, 2005
- Vatellus annae K.B.Miller, 2005
- Vatellus bifenestratus (Zimmermann, 1921)
- Vatellus drymetes K.B.Miller, 2005
- Vatellus grandis Buquet, 1840
- Vatellus haagi Wehncke, 1876
- Vatellus lateralis (Sharp, 1882)
- Vatellus maculosus K.B.Miller, 2005
- Vatellus mexicanus (Sharp, 1882)
- Vatellus perforatus (Guignot, 1955)
- Vatellus pilacaudus K.B.Miller, 2005
- Vatellus sahlbergi (Sharp, 1882)
- Vatellus tarsatus (Laporte, 1835)
- Vatellus ventralis (Sharp, 1882)
- Vatellus wheeleri K.B.Miller, 2005
