= Hydrodessus =

Scientific classification
- Kingdom: Animalia
- Phylum: Arthropoda
- Class: Insecta
- Order: Coleoptera
- Suborder: Adephaga
- Family: Dytiscidae
- Genus: Hydrodessus; J.Balfour-Browne, 1953

Genus of beetles

Hydrodessus is a genus of beetles in the family Dytiscidae, containing the following species:

- Hydrodessus amazonensis Spangler, 1966
- Hydrodessus angularis Young, 1970
- Hydrodessus biguttatus (Guignot, 1957)
- Hydrodessus brasiliensis (Guignot, 1957)
- Hydrodessus fragrans Spangler, 1985
- Hydrodessus jethoeae Makhan, 1994
- Hydrodessus nanayensis Spangler, 1966
- Hydrodessus octospilus (Guignot, 1957)
- Hydrodessus peloteretes Spangler, 1985
- Hydrodessus pereirai (Guignot, 1957)
- Hydrodessus phyllisae Spangler, 1985
- Hydrodessus rattanae Makhan, 1994
- Hydrodessus robinae Spangler, 1985
- Hydrodessus siolii J.Balfour-Browne, 1953
- Hydrodessus soekhnandanae Makhan, 1994
- Hydrodessus spanus Spangler, 1985
- Hydrodessus surinamensis Young, 1970
