= Kuschelydrus =

Kuschelydrus phreaticus

Scientific classification
- Domain: Eukaryota
- Kingdom: Animalia
- Phylum: Arthropoda
- Class: Insecta
- Order: Coleoptera
- Suborder: Adephaga
- Family: Dytiscidae
- Genus: Kuschelydrus; Ordish, 1976
- Species: K. phreaticus

Binomial name
- Kuschelydrus phreaticus Ordish, 1976

Genus of beetles

Kuschelydrus phreaticus is a species of beetles in the family Dytiscidae, the only species in the genus Kuschelydrus. (Note: Some sources, including Ordish 1985, spell the name Kuschelhydrus; but the spelling in Ordish 1976 is Kuschelydrus.)
