= Etruscodytes =

Scientific classification
- Kingdom: Animalia
- Phylum: Arthropoda
- Class: Insecta
- Order: Coleoptera
- Suborder: Adephaga
- Family: Dytiscidae
- Tribe: Hydroporini
- Genus: Etruscodytes; Mazza, Cianferoni & Rocchi, 2013
- Species: E. nethuns

Binomial name
- Etruscodytes nethuns Mazza, Cianferoni & Rocchi, 2013

Genus of beetles

Etruscodytes is a genus of predaceous diving beetles in the family Dytiscidae. There is one described species in Etruscodytes, E. nethuns, found in the Palearctic.
