= Sekaliporus =

Sekaliporus kriegi

Scientific classification
- Kingdom: Animalia
- Phylum: Arthropoda
- Class: Insecta
- Order: Coleoptera
- Suborder: Adephaga
- Family: Dytiscidae
- Genus: Sekaliporus; Watts, 1997
- Species: S. kriegi

Binomial name
- Sekaliporus kriegi Watts, 1997

Genus of beetles

Sekaliporus kriegi is a species of beetle in the family Dytiscidae, the only species in the genus Sekaliporus.
