= Austrodytes =

Scientific classification
- Kingdom: Animalia
- Phylum: Arthropoda
- Class: Insecta
- Order: Coleoptera
- Suborder: Adephaga
- Family: Dytiscidae
- Genus: Austrodytes; Watts, 1978

Genus of beetles

Austrodytes is a genus of beetles in the family Dytiscidae found only in northern Australia. It was first described in 1978 by Chris Watts. The genus contains these two species:

- Austrodytes insularis (Hope, 1841)
- Austrodytes plateni Hendrich, 2003
