= Metaporus =

Scientific classification
- Kingdom: Animalia
- Phylum: Arthropoda
- Class: Insecta
- Order: Coleoptera
- Suborder: Adephaga
- Family: Dytiscidae
- Genus: Metaporus; Guignot, 1945

Genus of beetles

Metaporus is a genus of beetles in the family Dytiscidae, containing the following species:

- Metaporus meridionalis (Aubé, 1838)
- Metaporus orientalis Toledo & Hosseinie, 2003
