= Carabhydrus =

Scientific classification
- Kingdom: Animalia
- Phylum: Arthropoda
- Class: Insecta
- Order: Coleoptera
- Suborder: Adephaga
- Family: Dytiscidae
- Genus: Carabhydrus; Watts, 1978

Genus of beetles

Carabhydrus is a genus of beetles in the family Dytiscidae, containing the following species:

- Carabhydrus andreas Zwick, 1981
- Carabhydrus monteithi Watts, 1978
- Carabhydrus mubboonus Larson & Storey, 1994
- Carabhydrus niger Watts, 1978
- Carabhydrus plicatus Watts, 1978
