= Morimotoa =

Scientific classification
- Kingdom: Animalia
- Phylum: Arthropoda
- Class: Insecta
- Order: Coleoptera
- Suborder: Adephaga
- Family: Dytiscidae
- Genus: Morimotoa; Uéno, 1957

Genus of beetles

Morimotoa is a genus of beetles in the family Dytiscidae, containing the following species:

- Morimotoa gigantea Uéno, 1996
- Morimotoa morimotoi Uéno, 1996
- Morimotoa phreatica Uéno, 1957
