= Miodytiscus =

Miodytiscus hirtipes

Scientific classification
- Kingdom: Animalia
- Phylum: Arthropoda
- Class: Insecta
- Order: Coleoptera
- Suborder: Adephaga
- Family: Dytiscidae
- Genus: Miodytiscus; Wickham, 1911
- Species: M. hirtipes

Binomial name
- Miodytiscus hirtipes Wickham, 1911

Genus of beetles

Miodytiscus hirtipes is a species of beetle in the family Dytiscidae, the only species in the genus Miodytiscus.
