= Microhydrodytes =

Scientific classification
- Domain: Eukaryota
- Kingdom: Animalia
- Phylum: Arthropoda
- Class: Insecta
- Order: Coleoptera
- Suborder: Adephaga
- Family: Dytiscidae
- Tribe: Hydrodytini
- Genus: Microhydrodytes; K.B. Miller, 2002
- Species: M. elachistus

Binomial name
- Microhydrodytes elachistus K.B. Miller, 2002

Genus of beetles

Microhydrodytes is a genus of predaceous diving beetles in the family Dytiscidae. There is one described species in Microhydrodytes, M. elachistus. It is found in the Neotropics.
