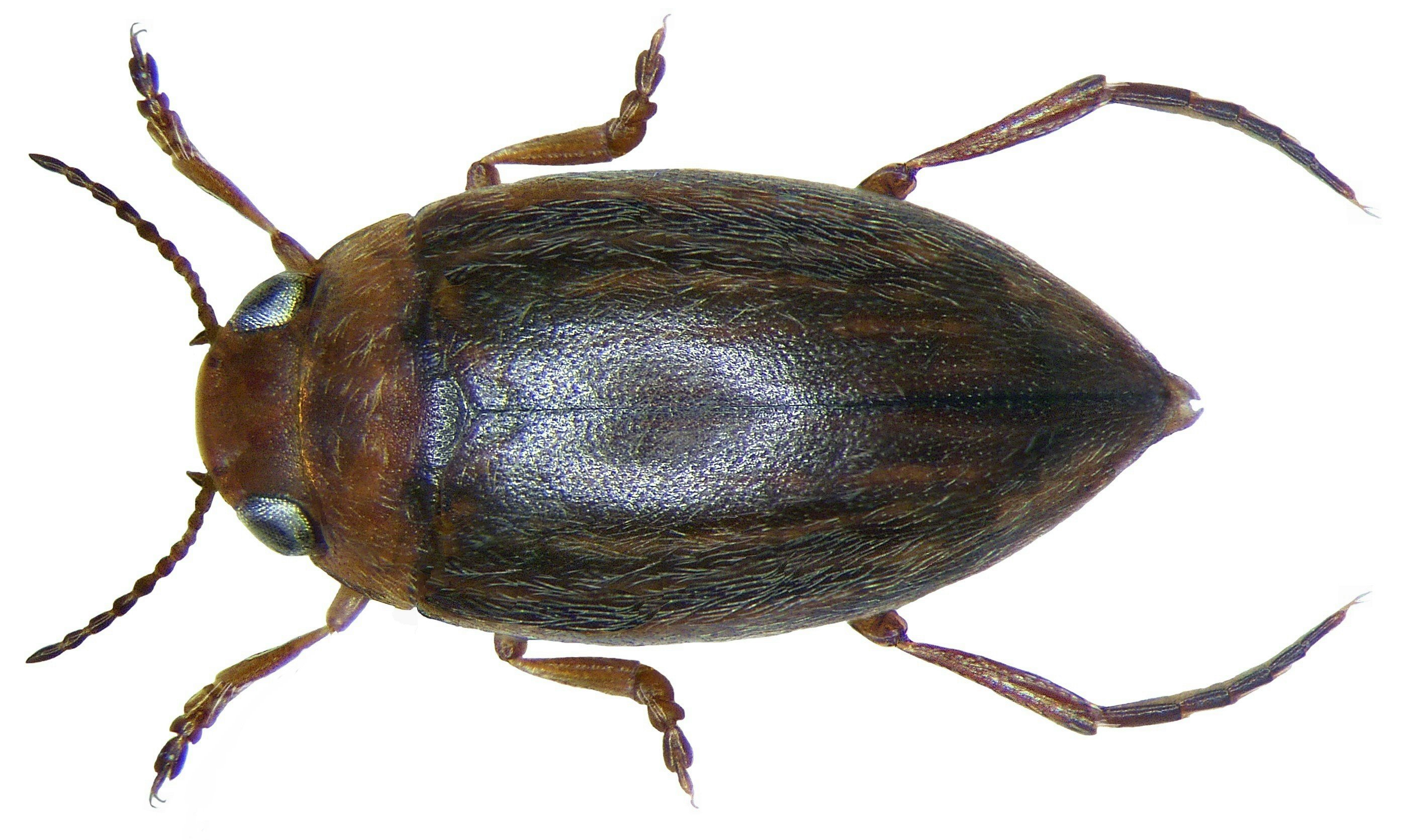
- Porhydrus lineatus (Fabricius, 1775)

Scientific classification
- Kingdom: Animalia
- Phylum: Arthropoda
- Class: Insecta
- Order: Coleoptera
- Suborder: Adephaga
- Family: Dytiscidae
- Genus: Porhydrus; Guignot, 1945

= Porhydrus =

Genus of beetles

Porhydrus is a genus of beetles in the family Dytiscidae, containing the following species:

- Porhydrus genei (Aubé, 1838)
- Porhydrus lineatus (Fabricius, 1775)
- Porhydrus obliquesignatus (Bielz, 1852)
- Porhydrus vicinus (Aubé, 1838)
