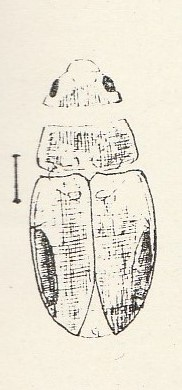

Scientific classification
- Kingdom: Animalia
- Phylum: Arthropoda
- Class: Insecta
- Order: Coleoptera
- Suborder: Adephaga
- Family: Dytiscidae
- Genus: †Procoelambus; Théobald, 1937

= Procoelambus =

Procoelambus macrocephalus

Genus of beetles

Procoelambus macrocephalus is an extinct species of beetle in the family Dytiscidae, the only species in the genus Procoelambus.
