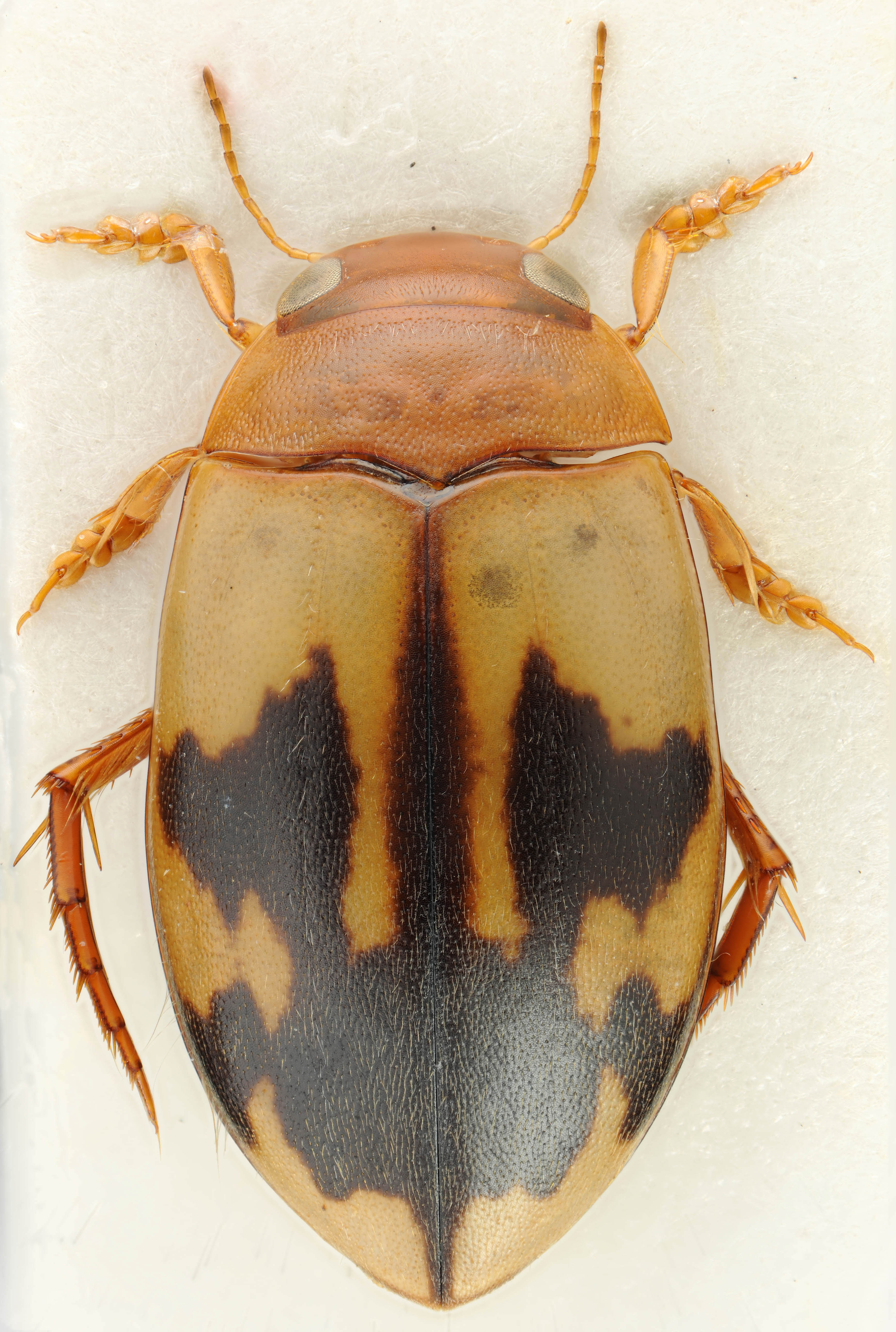
- Megaporus howitti

Scientific classification
- Domain: Eukaryota
- Kingdom: Animalia
- Phylum: Arthropoda
- Class: Insecta
- Order: Coleoptera
- Suborder: Adephaga
- Family: Dytiscidae
- Genus: Megaporus; Brinck, 1943

= Megaporus =

Genus of beetles

Megaporus is a genus of beetles in the family Dytiscidae.

== Description ==
Species of the genus Megaporus can be distinguished as sub-cylindrical with a body that narrows towards the abdominal apex. With a pear shaped head that tapers posteriorly but not constricted at the occipital level suture.

== Species ==
The following species are recognised in the genus Megaporus:

- Megaporus fischeri Mouchamps, 1964
- Megaporus gardnerii (Clark, 1862)
- Megaporus hamatus (Clark, 1862)
- Megaporus howittii (Clark, 1862)
- Megaporus natvigi Mouchamps, 1964
- Megaporus piceatus (Régimbart, 1892)
- Megaporus ruficeps (Sharp, 1882)
- Megaporus solidus (Sharp, 1882)
- Megaporus tristis (Zimmermann, 1926)
- Megaporus wilsoni Mouchamps, 1964
