= Anginopachria =

Scientific classification
- Kingdom: Animalia
- Phylum: Arthropoda
- Class: Insecta
- Order: Coleoptera
- Suborder: Adephaga
- Family: Dytiscidae
- Genus: Anginopachria; Wewalka, Balke & Hendrich, 2001

Genus of beetles

Anginopachria is a genus of beetles in the family Dytiscidae, containing the following species:

- Anginopachria prudeki Wewalka, Balke, Hájek & Hendrich, 2005
- Anginopachria schoedli Wewalka, Balke, Hájek & Hendrich, 2005
- Anginopachria ullrichi (Balke & Hendrich, 1999)
