= Trichonectes =

Trichonectes otini

Scientific classification
- Kingdom: Animalia
- Phylum: Arthropoda
- Class: Insecta
- Order: Coleoptera
- Suborder: Adephaga
- Family: Dytiscidae
- Genus: Trichonectes; Guignot, 1941
- Species: T. otini

Binomial name
- Trichonectes otini Guignot, 1941

Genus of beetles

Trichonectes otini is a species of beetle in the family Dytiscidae, the only species in the genus Trichonectes.
