= Laccornellus =

Scientific classification
- Kingdom: Animalia
- Phylum: Arthropoda
- Class: Insecta
- Order: Coleoptera
- Suborder: Adephaga
- Family: Dytiscidae
- Genus: Laccornellus; Roughley & Wolfe, 1987

Genus of beetles

Laccornellus is a genus of beetles in the family Dytiscidae, containing the following species:

- Laccornellus copelatoides (Sharp, 1882)
- Laccornellus lugubris (Aubé, 1838)
