= Palaeodytes =

Palaeodytes Temporal range: Oxfordian–Aptian

Scientific classification
- Domain: Eukaryota
- Kingdom: Animalia
- Phylum: Arthropoda
- Class: Insecta
- Order: Coleoptera
- Suborder: Adephaga
- Family: Dytiscidae
- Subfamily: incertae sedis
- Genus: †Palaeodytes; Ponomarenko, 1987

Genus of beetles

Palaeodytes is an extinct genus of beetles in the family Dytiscidae, containing the following species:

- Palaeodytes baissiensis Prokin, Petrov, Wang & Ponomarenko, 2013 Zaza Formation, Russia, Early Cretaceous (Aptian)
- Palaeodytes gutta Ponomarenko, 1987 Karabastau Formation, Kazakhstan, Late Jurassic (Oxfordian)
- Palaeodytes sibiricus Ponomarenko, 1987 Zaza Formation, Russia, Early Cretaceous (Aptian)

The species "Palaeodytes" incompletus Ponomarenko, Coram & Jarzembowski, 2005 – described from Durlston Formation, United Kingdom, Early Cretaceous (Berriasian) – does not belong in Palaeodytes, but to an undescribed genus.
