= Hyderodes =

Scientific classification
- Kingdom: Animalia
- Phylum: Arthropoda
- Class: Insecta
- Order: Coleoptera
- Suborder: Adephaga
- Family: Dytiscidae
- Genus: Hyderodes; Hope, 1838

Genus of beetles

Hyderodes is a genus of beetles in the family Dytiscidae, containing only these two species:

- Hyderodes crassus Sharp, 1882
- Hyderodes shuckardi Hope, 1838

Hyerodes crassus is found in southwestern Australia, and H. shuckardi is found in southeastern Australia and Tasmania.
