= Typhlodessus =

Typhlodessus monteithi

Scientific classification
- Kingdom: Animalia
- Phylum: Arthropoda
- Class: Insecta
- Order: Coleoptera
- Suborder: Adephaga
- Family: Dytiscidae
- Genus: Typhlodessus; Brancucci, 1985
- Species: T. monteithi

Binomial name
- Typhlodessus monteithi Brancucci, 1985

Genus of beetles

Typhlodessus monteithi is a species of beetles in the family Dytiscidae, the only species in the genus Typhlodessus.
