= Hydropeplus =

Scientific classification
- Kingdom: Animalia
- Phylum: Arthropoda
- Class: Insecta
- Order: Coleoptera
- Suborder: Adephaga
- Family: Dytiscidae
- Genus: Hydropeplus; Sharp, 1882

Genus of beetles

Hydropeplus is a genus of beetles in the family Dytiscidae, containing the following species:

- Hydropeplus montanus Omer-Cooper, 1965
- Hydropeplus trimaculatus (Laporte, 1835)
