= Canthyporus =

Scientific classification
- Kingdom: Animalia
- Phylum: Arthropoda
- Class: Insecta
- Order: Coleoptera
- Suborder: Adephaga
- Family: Dytiscidae
- Genus: Canthyporus; Zimmermann, 1919

Genus of beetles

Canthyporus is a genus of beetles in the family Dytiscidae, containing the following species:

- Canthyporus aenigmaticus Biström & Nilsson, 2006
- Canthyporus alpestris Guignot, 1936
- Canthyporus alvei Omer-Cooper, 1965
- Canthyporus angustatus Omer-Cooper, 1965
- Canthyporus bicinctus (Régimbart, 1895)
- Canthyporus brincki Omer-Cooper, 1965
- Canthyporus canthydroides (Régimbart, 1895)
- Canthyporus congener Omer-Cooper, 1956
- Canthyporus consuetus Omer-Cooper, 1965
- Canthyporus cooperae Guignot, 1951
- Canthyporus exilis (Boheman, 1848)
- Canthyporus fluviatilis Omer-Cooper, 1956
- Canthyporus guignoti Omer-Cooper, 1956
- Canthyporus guttatus Omer-Cooper, 1956
- Canthyporus hottentottus (Gemminger & Harold, 1868)
- Canthyporus hynesi Nilsson, 1991
- Canthyporus kenyensis Bilardo & Sanfilippo, 1979
- Canthyporus lateralis (Boheman, 1848)
- Canthyporus latus Omer-Cooper, 1965
- Canthyporus loeffleri Wewalka, 1981
- Canthyporus lowryi Omer-Cooper, 1965
- Canthyporus navigator Guignot, 1951
- Canthyporus nebulosus Omer-Cooper, 1965
- Canthyporus nimius Biström & Nilsson, 2006
- Canthyporus parvus Omer-Cooper, 1955
- Canthyporus pauliani Guignot, 1951
- Canthyporus petulans Guignot, 1951
- Canthyporus planus Omer-Cooper, 1965
- Canthyporus regimbarti Nilsson, 2001
- Canthyporus sigillatus (Guignot, 1955)
- Canthyporus subparallelus Guignot, 1956
- Canthyporus swaziensis Omer-Cooper, 1956
- Canthyporus testaceus Zimmermann, 1923
- Canthyporus turneri Biström & Nilsson, 2006
- Canthyporus wewalkai Biström & Nilsson, 2006
