= Incomptodessus =

Scientific classification
- Domain: Eukaryota
- Kingdom: Animalia
- Phylum: Arthropoda
- Class: Insecta
- Order: Coleoptera
- Suborder: Adephaga
- Family: Dytiscidae
- Tribe: Bidessini
- Genus: Incomptodessus; K.B. Miller & García, 2011
- Species: I. camachoi

Binomial name
- Incomptodessus camachoi K.B. Miller & García, 2011

Genus of beetles

Incomptodessus is a genus of predaceous diving beetles in the family Dytiscidae. There is one described species in Incomptodessus, I. camachoi, found in the Neotropics.
