= Petrodessus =

Scientific classification
- Domain: Eukaryota
- Kingdom: Animalia
- Phylum: Arthropoda
- Class: Insecta
- Order: Coleoptera
- Suborder: Adephaga
- Family: Dytiscidae
- Tribe: Bidessini
- Genus: Petrodessus; K.B. Miller, 2012
- Species: P. conatus

Binomial name
- Petrodessus conatus K.B. Miller, 2012

Genus of beetles

Petrodessus is a genus of predaceous diving beetles in the family Dytiscidae. There is one described species in Petrodessus, P. conatus, found in Australasia.
