= Siamoporus =

Siamoporus deharvengi

Scientific classification
- Kingdom: Animalia
- Phylum: Arthropoda
- Class: Insecta
- Order: Coleoptera
- Suborder: Adephaga
- Family: Dytiscidae
- Genus: Siamoporus; Spangler, 1996
- Species: S. deharvengi

Binomial name
- Siamoporus deharvengi Spangler, 1996

Genus of beetles

Siamoporus deharvengi is a species of aquatic beetle in the family Dytiscidae, the only species in the genus Siamoporus. It is only known from a cave in the Khon Kaen Province, Thailand, and like other cave-adapted beetles it has reduced pigment, and lacks eyes and functional wings. It is typically about 3.2–3.6 mm (0.13–0.14 in) long. Siamoporus is a member of Hydroporini and it is not easily separated from some of the other cave-living species in this tribe.
