= Agnoshydrus =

Scientific classification
- Kingdom: Animalia
- Phylum: Arthropoda
- Class: Insecta
- Order: Coleoptera
- Suborder: Adephaga
- Family: Dytiscidae
- Genus: Agnoshydrus; Biström, Nilsson & Wewalka, 1997

Genus of beetles

Agnoshydrus is a genus of beetles in the family Dytiscidae, containing the following eight species:

- Agnoshydrus barong (Hendrich, Balke & Wewalka, 1995)
- Agnoshydrus ciampori Wewalka & Wang, 2007
- Agnoshydrus confusus Wewalka & Biström, 1997
- Agnoshydrus densus Biström, Nilsson & Wewalka, 1997
- Agnoshydrus laccophiloides (Régimbart, 1888)
- Agnoshydrus paulbrowni Wewalka & Wang, 2007
- Agnoshydrus schillhammeri Wewalka, 1999
- Agnoshydrus taiwanus Wewalka & Wang, 2007
