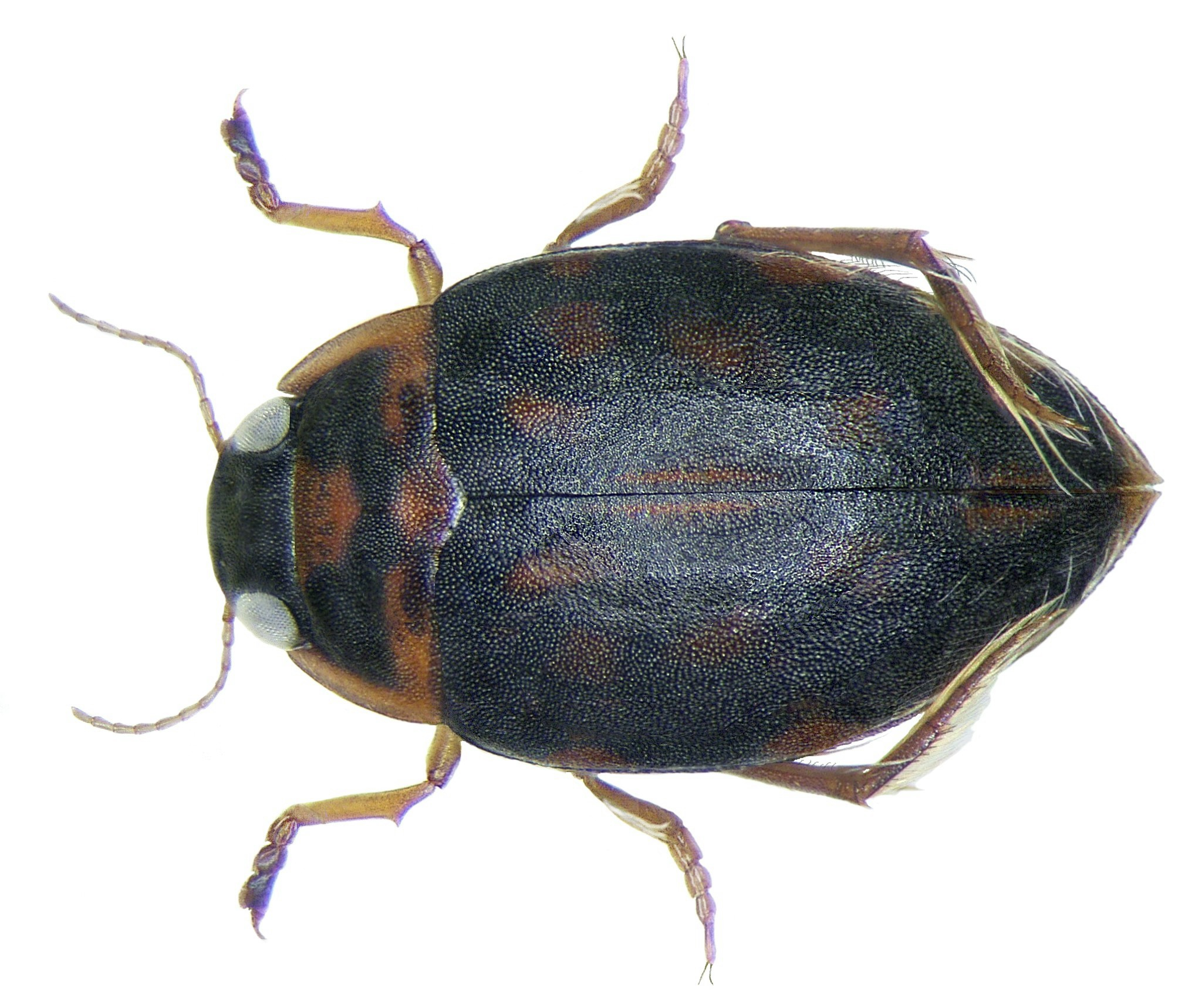
- Dorsal view of Tiporus emmae beetle

Scientific classification
- Kingdom: Animalia
- Phylum: Arthropoda
- Class: Insecta
- Order: Coleoptera
- Suborder: Adephaga
- Family: Dytiscidae
- Genus: Tiporus; Watts, 1985

= Tiporus =

Genus of beetles

Tiporus is a genus of beetles in the family Dytiscidae, containing the following species:

- Tiporus alastairi (Watts, 1978)
- Tiporus centralis (Watts, 1978)
- Tiporus collaris (Hope, 1841)
- Tiporus denticulatus (Watts, 1978)
- Tiporus georginae Watts, 2000
- Tiporus giuliani (Watts, 1978)
- Tiporus josepheni (Watts, 1978)
- Tiporus lachlani Watts, 2000
- Tiporus moriartyensis Watts, 2000
- Tiporus tambreyi (Watts, 1978)
- Tiporus undecimmaculatus (Clark, 1862)
