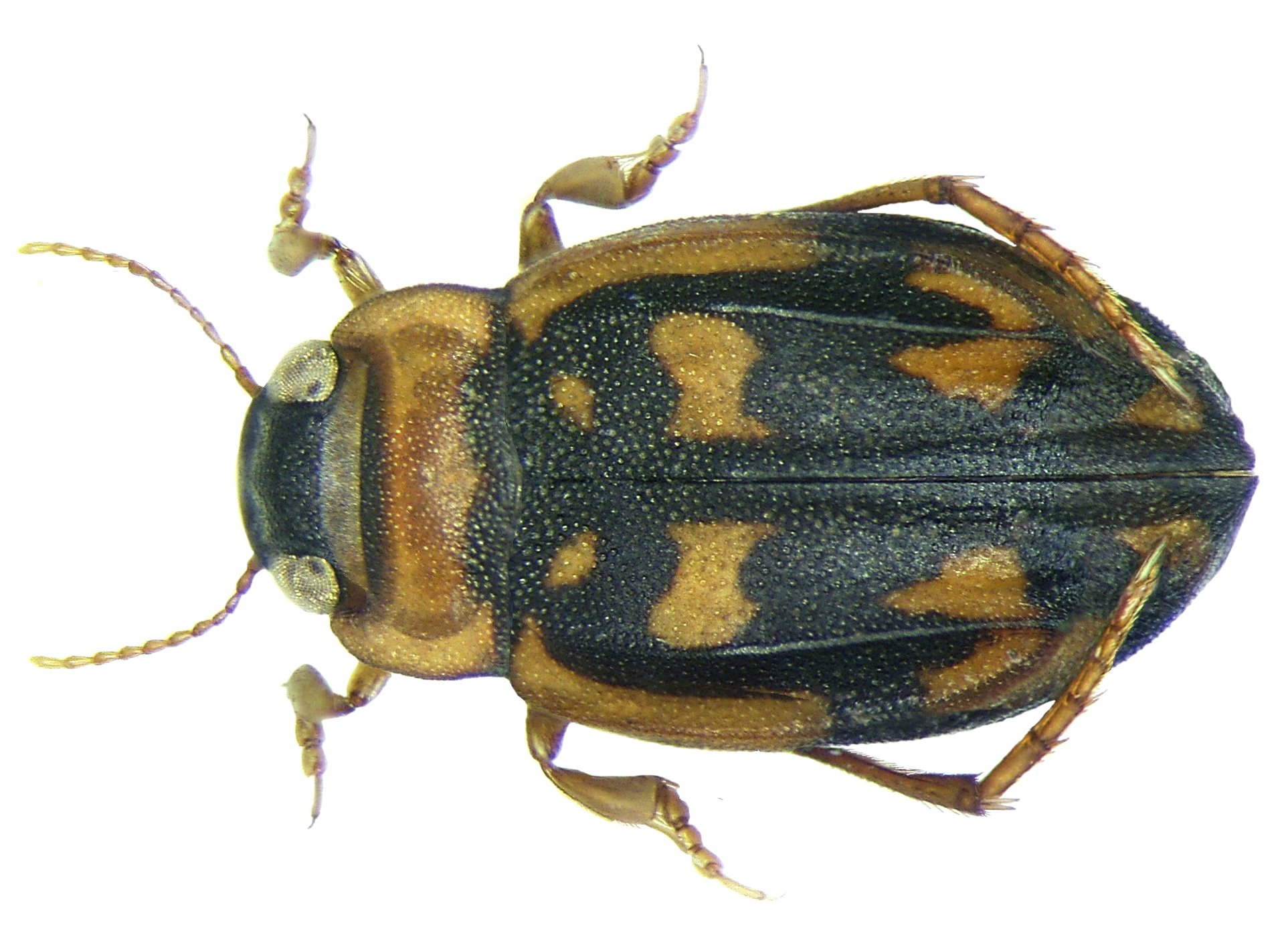
- Peschetius carinipennis

Scientific classification
- Kingdom: Animalia
- Phylum: Arthropoda
- Class: Insecta
- Order: Coleoptera
- Suborder: Adephaga
- Family: Dytiscidae
- Genus: Peschetius; Guignot, 1942

= Peschetius =

Genus of beetles

Peschetius is a genus of beetles in the family Dytiscidae, containing the following species:

- Peschetius aethiopicus Omer-Cooper, 1964
- Peschetius carinipennis (Régimbart, 1895)
- Peschetius nigeriensis Omer-Cooper, 1970
- Peschetius nodieri (Régimbart, 1895)
- Peschetius parvus Omer-Cooper, 1970
- Peschetius quadricostatus (Aubé, 1838)
- Peschetius sudanensis Omer-Cooper, 1970
- Peschetius toxophorus Guignot, 1942
- Peschetius ultimus Biström & Nilsson, 2003
