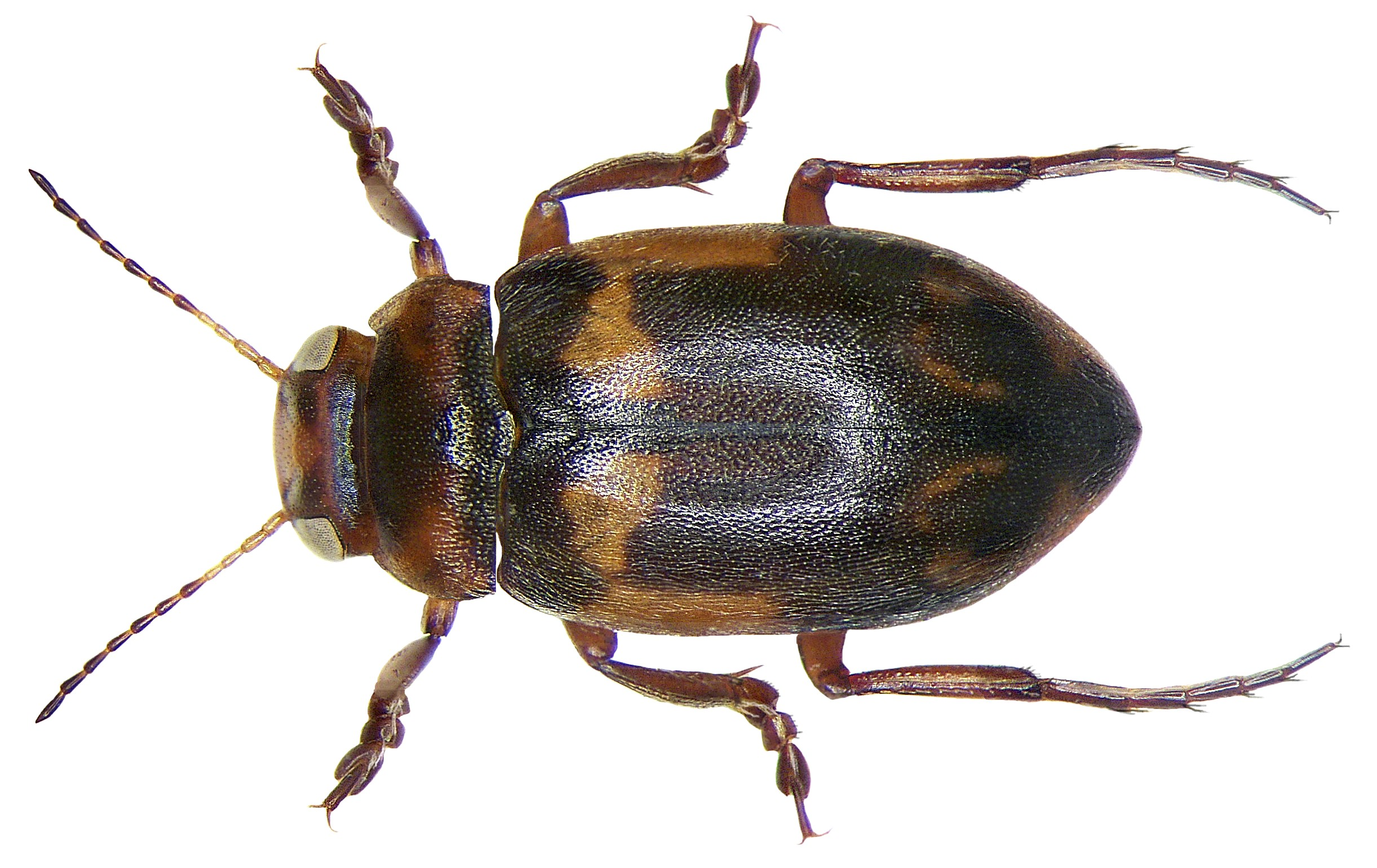

Scientific classification
- Kingdom: Animalia
- Phylum: Arthropoda
- Class: Insecta
- Order: Coleoptera
- Suborder: Adephaga
- Family: Dytiscidae
- Genus: Suphrodytes; Gozis, 1914
- Species: S. dorsalis

Binomial name
- Suphrodytes dorsalis (Fabricius, 1787)

= Suphrodytes =

Suphrodytes dorsalis

Genus of beetles

Suphrodytes dorsalis is a species of beetle in the family Dytiscidae, the only species in the genus Suphrodytes.
