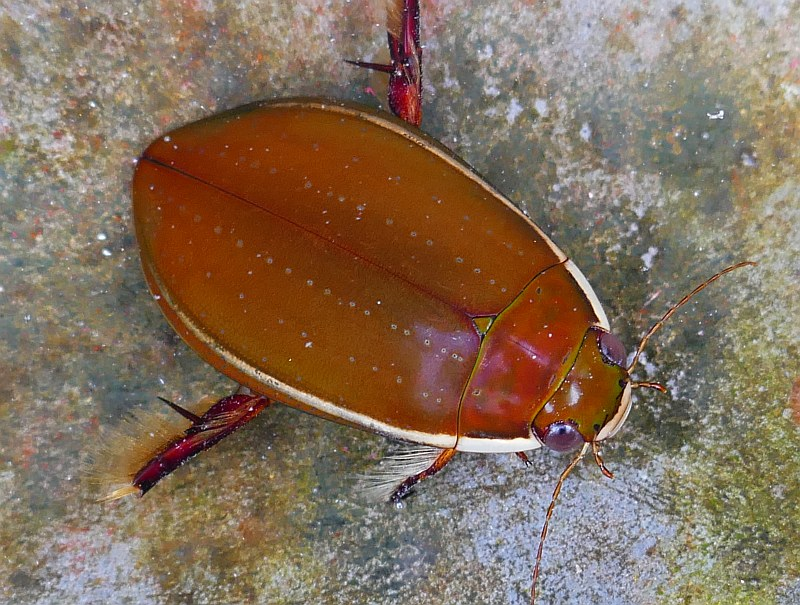
- Cybister lateralimarginalis

Scientific classification
- Kingdom: Animalia
- Phylum: Arthropoda
- Clade: Pancrustacea
- Class: Insecta
- Order: Coleoptera
- Suborder: Adephaga
- Superfamily: Dytiscoidea
- Family: Dytiscidae; Leach, 1815

Subfamilies
- Agabinae Thomson, 1867; Colymbetinae Erichson, 1837; Copelatinae Branden, 1885; Coptotominae Branden, 1885; Cybistrinae Sharp, 1880; Dytiscinae Leach, 1815; Hydrodytinae Miller, 2001; Hydroporinae Aubé, 1836; Laccophilinae Gistel, 1856; Lancetinae Branden, 1885; Matinae Branden, 1885; † Liadytiscinae Prokin & Ren, 2010

= Dytiscidae =

Dytiscidae Temporal range: Late Jurassic–Recent

Family of beetles

The Dytiscidae, from the Ancient Greek word δυτικός (dutikós), meaning "able to dive", are the predaceous diving beetles, a family of water beetles. They occur in virtually any freshwater habitat around the world, but a few species live in terrestrial habitats such as among leaf litter. The "diving" in their common name comes from their cycling between underwater and the surface to replenish oxygen like a diver. The adults of most are between 1 and 2.5 cm (0.4–1.0 in) long, though much variation is seen between species. The European Dytiscus latissimus and Brazilian Bifurcitus ducalis are the largest, reaching up to 4.5 and 4.75 cm (1.8 and 1.9 in) respectively, although the latter is listed as extinct by the IUCN. In contrast, the smallest is likely the Australian Limbodessus atypicali of subterranean waters, which only is about 0.9 mm (0.035 in) long. Most are dark brown, blackish, or dark olive in color with golden highlights in some subfamilies. The larvae are commonly known as water tigers due to their voracious appetite. They have short, but sharp mandibles, and immediately upon biting, they deliver digestive enzymes into prey to suck their liquefied remains. The family includes more than 4,000 described species in numerous genera. The oldest of the species is †Palaeodytes gutta, from the Late Jurassic according to Karabastau Formation fossils.

Species employ diverse techniques and traits to source their oxygen underwater. Dytiscidae are adept swimmers, thanks to their enlarged, flattened hind legs with setae and smooth, streamlined, and solid body. Dytiscidae boast distinctive chemical properties, such as defensive secretions containing steroids not known in any other animal. For this reason, diving beetles have been a source for pharmaceutical company R&D. In different parts of East Africa, young girls and boys prompt bites from the beetles for pubertal benefits, and for boys, to help them learn to whistle.

Dytiscidae have also attracted study for notable parts of their evolution, including a sexual arms race, and their body size evolution following a rare early burst model. Ecologically, dytiscids' main limiting factors are anthropogenic activity, fish, and parasitic mites. Surface color and a sufficiency of aquatic plants are other influences on diving beetles' habitats. Due to being most common in unpolluted water, they can be a good water quality indicator. They can potentially control mosquito populations by feeding on larvae, as well. They are able fliers so that they can colonize different habitats. Some species live up to several years, and most are univoltine with 2-3 month breeding periods. Various species overwinter, estivate, or enter diapause. In culture, the diving beetle is prominent in a Cherokee creation story.

== Shape and morphology ==
=== Habitus ===
Like most other water beetles, adult Dytiscidae have an oval habitus, often tapering toward the head with the pronotum widest at the base. Generally, it is smooth, flattened, and solid. Many species are only smooth macroscopically, though. The dorsum often has microsculpturing, including a mesh of loops, shagreen, lining, dotting, hatching, or granulation in combinations varying by species.

The head, thorax, and abdomen are all streamlined; that is, they are integrated into a single, overall cohesive oval, as opposed to the three visibly articulate sections of some Carabidae like Brachinus. The elytra are so prominent that they conceal the abdominal sclerites.

=== Structure ===
==== Head ====
The head is prognathous both in the adult and larval stages and wider than tall in shape. To a degree, it is drawn into the pronotum, whose pointed anterior, lateral angles abut the head's edge. The clypeus and frons of the head are fused.

Diving beetles largely conform to one mouthpiece model, with the following characteristics:

- A transverse upper lip with a notch in the middle of the anterior edge
- The mandibles' apex forked into two
- Large, sickle-shaped lacinia with apex pointed and covered with dense strong hairs along the inner edge
- Narrow galeae, with two segments as in most other Adephaga
- Maxillary palpi with four segments and a developed palpiger, and labial palpi with three
- Large submentum apically expanded into lateral projections
- Transverse, concave mentum with wide, upward-curved lateral projections meeting the prementum
- Transverse prementum with the anterior margin moderately notched and covered with long setae
- Notch on the mentum's anteromedial edge forming a median projection
- Another notch on the projection

==== Abdomen ====
Diving beetles across subfamilies have a set of six abdominal segments, or ventrites, visible on the belly. They are lined up roughly perpendicularly to the sagittal plane, one after the other. The segments can occupy much of the abdomen's ventral side, from the anterior to the posterior. All the visible segments have different lengths in alignment with the oval shape's curvature. The last ventrite, on the anus, is the hypopygidium. It is modified to end in a notch, tubercle, or keel at the apex, and its surface texture is often wrinkly. Sometimes, the hypopygidium receives a process of the elytra's epipleura inserted into the former's pit. Accompanying the ventrites are 8 tergites and 8 variously-sized pairs of spiracles for breathing. Also an identifying feature of the belly is the prosternal process. It usually projects back to the mesocoxae in a spear shape.

The male aedeagus is symmetrical, although Dytiscidae is among the beetle families whose aedeagus experiences retournement (180° longitudinal turning) over development. The female ovipositor includes a pair of appendages connected with the hypopygidium called gonocoxites and basal sclerites called valvifers. The structure is set into the abdomen.

==== Legs ====
The four anterior legs are rather short, and the front pair is slightly flattened, whereas the hind legs are enlarged and strongly flattened for swimming. Generally, the legs' front tibiae lack spines. The tarsi have a tarsal formula of 5-5-5 and either one or two claws. Species with two claws have their mesoscutellum large and exposed. The claws are not toothed and can either be equal or unequal in size. The fore and middle tarsi have four segments, with the fourth sometimes very small and concealed between the third segment's lobes.

=== Identification ===
Unlike Noteridae and most Hydrophilidae, the dorsal surface is not more strongly convex than the ventral. Dytiscidae also differ from Noteridae in their mandibles, since they lack enlarged portions there of the molars. The antennae are glabrous and number up to 11 depending on the species. Dytiscid antennae are threadlike, generally longer than the head's width, and look like their palps except longer, whereas hydrophilid and gyrinid antennae are clubbed. Their eyes are flat rather than protruding out, and, unlike Gyrinidae, are not divided. Unlike Carabidae, they do not have a transverse suture on their metasternum. They also lack the keel-like feature between the legs of many hydrophilids. All known diving beetles except ones in the genus Celina have the scutellum concealed, with only a minuscule part seen from the surface. This does not mean that the scutellum is invisible as in Noteridae.

=== Sexual dimorphism ===
Many species in Dytiscidae are sexually dimorphic. Males have suction cup-like palettes on their legs to help them keep grip of females during copulation, and, in many species, females have furrows on their elytra and variously the pronotum and base of the head. In males, these parts are smooth. The furrows of the female uneven the elytral structure, interfering with the male's grip. They weaken it likely with the aim of increasing the female's control over mating.

=== Size ===
The length of adults averages at 1 to 2.5 cm (0.4–1.0 in), and the elongate larvae range from 1 to 5 cm (0.39 to 1.97 in). The largest known adults are of the species Megadytes ducalis, at up to 4.75 cm (1.9 in), and Dytiscus latissimus, at up to 4.5 (1.8 in). At about 0.9 mm (0.035 in), meanwhile, Limbodessus atypicali is likely the smallest.

=== Color ===
Most are dark brown, blackish, or dark olive in color. Diving beetles in some subfamilies sport golden highlights on the dorsal borders, others variously-colored spots or bands. Sometimes, diving beetles are reflective with a metallic appearance.

== Swimming and water navigation ==
=== Role of body shape ===
Diving beetles' shape is optimized to ease navigation through water by reducing drag and improving stability while swimming. No segment moves or bends off balance due to being integrated with the others. This reduces form drag in two ways. One, it minimizes frontal resistance, which can upturn a swimmer with an uneven position. Two, it minimizes eddies, or waves, from eddy resistance that excessive, especially jerky, movement can incur. As they swim, diving beetles further streamline their bodies by tucking their four former legs into well-fitting grooves. Their bodies' water resistance differs considerably by hunting type, such as search or ambush.

=== Oxygen ===
Like other water beetles, adult Dytiscidae get their oxygen while swimming by storing air in a space between their elytra and abdomen. At the same time, they can also diffuse dissolved oxygen from the water. The former ability keeps Dytiscidae alive underwater for about 30 minutes, whereas the two combined can give them around 24–36 hours' worth of oxygen in one go. Some Dytiscidae have an additional way: using their elytra as a respiratory organ. One of them, Deronectes aubei, has been recorded to survive 6 weeks without atmospheric oxygen. Deronectes aubei and other smaller Hydroporinae have specialized setae on the elytra, pronotum, and ventral side that act as tracheal gills. The setae form a layer that keeps out water and traps air. Smaller species like these can also stay underwater for weeks because they can live off oxygen from natural vegetation. Another feature acting as a gill in diving beetles is a small air bubble pressed out from the subelytral cavity and held by the hydrofuge hairs at the tip of the abdomen. The bubble shrinks over time, requiring the beetles to surface periodically due to gas exchange decreasing. This behavior of alternating between the surface and high depths is why they are known as diving beetles. When bigger species break the surface, they "hang" on it with their rear end protruding slightly. Along with regaining their bubble, they can also bend their abdomen slightly downwards for gas exchange in the subelytral opening. Since larvae lack ventral gills, larvae instead have a siphon at the tip of the abdomen that they draw in air with.

=== Role of hind legs ===
Their two hind legs are much larger and wider than the other two pairs of legs so that they can use them as oars or paddles and move faster. The setae on the legs are there to help them change direction quickly while swimming. They can swim both forwards and in reverse effectively without needing to rotate. Unlike Hydrophilidae, their hind legs move in synchrony while swimming, namely during the forward and backward motions. The legs move asymmetrically while turning, in opposing directions, to steer the beetle sideways. Unlike other aquatic animals such as turtles, jellyfish, fish, and frogs, they both can stay in one direction while retreating and have a lower turning radius when they do turn. These strengths are a testament to their superior flexibility.

=== Process ===
Diving beetles' swimming process as a whole cycles between two steps together equivalent to rowing: the power stroke and the recovery stroke. The power stroke's function is to increase propulsion by means of maximizing the beetle's cross-sectional area and involves two actions. One, the tarsi stretch out, as a result also rotating the connected tibiae longitudinally and flattening them. This use of the segmented legs gives diving beetles an advantage over human rowers when it comes to straightening the legs. Two, the setae on the tibiae bristle out and maximize water resistance. Because of the thrust that the hind legs give, the speed of each cycle peaks in this stroke. This peak spans 60% of the stroke according to the findings of Qi et al (2021). In the recovery stroke, the beetle then reduces the water resistance with an equalizing effect by rotating its tarsi 90° and folding the setae flat. The same study finds that each cycle lasts for about 272 milliseconds, and the power stroke takes up about 47% of it. Most of the acceleration happens in the first 50 milliseconds. Likely for the purpose of escaping from predators, the acceleration is especially high when swimming backwards, with the increase in speed recorded to be from 0 to 27.3 cm/s. In 25 milliseconds, the average acceleration is 9.8 m/s^{2}, whereas the average of the whole first 50 milliseconds of each forward swimming cycle is about 1.68 m/s^{2}. The speed of the forward swimming cycle is on average about 8.74 cm/s, maximum 12.9 cm/s, and minimum 5.69 cm/s. The angular velocity of the turning cycle is on average about 8.3 rad/s, maximum 12.9 rad/s, and minimum 0.83 rad/s.

=== Use of rectum underwater ===
An ability specific to the smaller of the diving beetles is to rapidly blast ingested water out from the rectum. This is a solution to water surface tension impeding them from leaving the water to fly up away from it. On top of that, the rectal ampulla serves as a hydrostatic organ to regulate underwater buoyancy. To decrease buoyancy, diving beetles ingest water. To increase it, they expel water from their rectum like they do against surface tension. Diving beetles strategically adjust their fill to the optimal buoyancy over changing conditions. The goal is for the body to have approximately the same specific gravity as the water.

== Chemical senses ==
The chemical senses of diving beetles, smell and taste, are strong. These senses provide for their need to identify potential food. Their taste receptors are concentrated on the maxillary and labial palpi, and they can detect sweet, sour, salty, and bitter chemicals. Then, the antennal surface is where the receptors for smell occupy. For males, this surface doubles as a way to locate female conspecifics ready to mate. Females have the ability to secrete olfactory pheromones attracting males within an area of 20–30 cm. This form of sexual signaling has been speculatively connected with the expanded antennomeres seen in the males of many groups in Dytiscidae.

Diving beetles are attracted to alarm pheromones emitted by fish that they eat as prey. In this way, the pheromones work against the fish as kairomones.

== Defense ==
=== Chemical ===
From their pygidial gland, medium and large-sized species can secrete two types of substances: one a fluid and the other a paste-like solid. Oftentimes they go above water to groom themselves with their secretions, especially the paste, and distribute them on their body surfaces. They are an antimicrobial safeguard, protecting against bacteria and ciliates. Underwater, diving beetles apply them to sensitive body parts like spiraculi and subelytral tergal respiratory surfaces to protect them from water. Chemically, the secretion-grooming paste consists of benzoic acid, a glycoprotein, and some phenols, particularly methyl p-hydroxybenzoate and p-hydroxybenzaldehyde. Until the secretions are released, they stay in a reservoir within the pygidial gland. The reservoirs are covered with muscle layers so that the muscles can move them out when it is time. In conjunction with the pygidial glands are the prothoracic glands, another source of defensive secretions. The prothoracic glands' reservoirs are not covered with muscle layers unlike the pygidial glands'. Instead, diving beetles use internal turgor pressure and contract their tergo-sternal muscles. Once the secretions leave the reservoirs, they are discharged by way of one muscle that has its origin on the cervical membrane. Besides managing surface tension and buoyancy, the rectal ampulla is also a source of defense. When disturbed, diving beetle have the option to release odorous food residues from there to deter any organisms. Chemical defenses combat not only against parasites, but also predators. Steroids in the secretions can force a predator such as fish to regurgitate the beetle. A kind especially prevalent in diving beetles is pregnanes, such as 11-deoxycorticosterone. Experiments have shown pregnanes to possibly deter fish, protecting diving beetles from predation. Diving beetles are known to be the only family in the whole animal kingdom to produce certain kinds of steroids. For this reason, they are an important source for pharmaceutical R&D. Chemicals in diving beetle secretions can also anesthetize or even kill predators. Other chemicals produced include a variety of aromatic esters, acids, and aldehydes.

=== Other ===
Small species do not have chemical defenses, so instead opt to avoid danger by reducing their activity underwater or dispersing themselves when in groups. Diving beetles can also defend themselves by playing dead (thanatosis). Species hide, escape, and bite, as well. Larger species such as Cybistrinae and Dytiscinae kick with their hind legs.

== Habitat ==
Diving beetles are the most diverse beetles in the aquatic environment and can be found in almost every kind of freshwater habitat, from small rock pools to big lakes. Some dytiscid species are also found in brackish water. Diving beetles live in water bodies in various landscapes, including agricultural and urban landscapes. Some species, such as Agabus uliginosus and Acilius canaliculatus, are found to be relatively tolerant to recent urbanisation. One of the most important limiting factors for diving beetle occurrence is the presence of fish, which predate on the beetles (mostly on larvae), compete for food, and change the structure of the habitat. The presence or absence of fish can also affect habitat use and habitat selection of dytiscids. Some species, such as Oreodytes sanmarkii, occur in exposed areas of waters, whereas many diving beetles species prefer habitats with aquatic plants, especially plants with complex structures, such as sedges and bulrush. Like other insects, their presence can be a good indicator of water quality. Oftentimes, surface color is a determiner of a diving beetle's water environment. Having bright colors with markings is tied to clear waters with mineral substrates, and being melanin-high or green to habitats with dark substrates or dense vegetation. Some diving beetles live in areas in seasonal droughts. In these cases, they respond by either entering a terrestrial diapause or burrow into the stream substratum often down to 70–90 cm. The burrowing solution is likely the reason for their high survival rates following droughts. In addition, they can likely estivate over summertime dry spells.

When they need to colonize a new habitat for mating or better conditions, they fly and look for light reflections from the water surface. In urban areas, diving beetles' attraction to lights draws them erroneously to artificial lights and glossy surfaces on cars, etc. Meanwhile, on land, the gait of many adult diving beetles can appear awkward or clumsy due to their enlarged hind legs.

=== Specializations ===
A special stygobitic variety of dytiscids only live underground. Habitats include pitch-dark wells, boreholes, and caves. Most stygobitic species are in the subfamily Hydroporinae, however Exocelina abdita and Copelatus cessaina have been discovered as among the exceptions. Select Hydroporinae species live in terrestrial habitats, such as dry forest floor depressions or leaf litter, at least in the adult stage. Stygobitic species are prevalent in Western Australia because of the groundwater coming from its large network of paleodrainages. There, the beetles have been recorded to live in groundwater estuaries of salt lakes and shallow calcretes. Some species in Africophilus, Agabus, Fontidessus, Hydroporus, Hydrotrupes, and Platynectes are specialized for living in hygropetic habitats. Some, such as Hydroporus sardomontanus, are semi-hygropetric. Another less common environment type is interstitial or semi-subterranean habitats, such as gravel banks along rivers. Examples of interstitial species include Exocelina saltusholmesensis, Agabus paludosus, and Hydroporus bithynicus. Some of the stygobitic, interstitial, and terrestrial dytiscids have depigmentation and reduced or, in stygobitic species, none at all. Terrestrial species tend to also be smaller and have no setae on the mid and hind legs due to not swimming. Stygobitic species have fused elytra and an absence of wings. Interstitial species can have long sensory setae and reduced wings.

== Diet ==
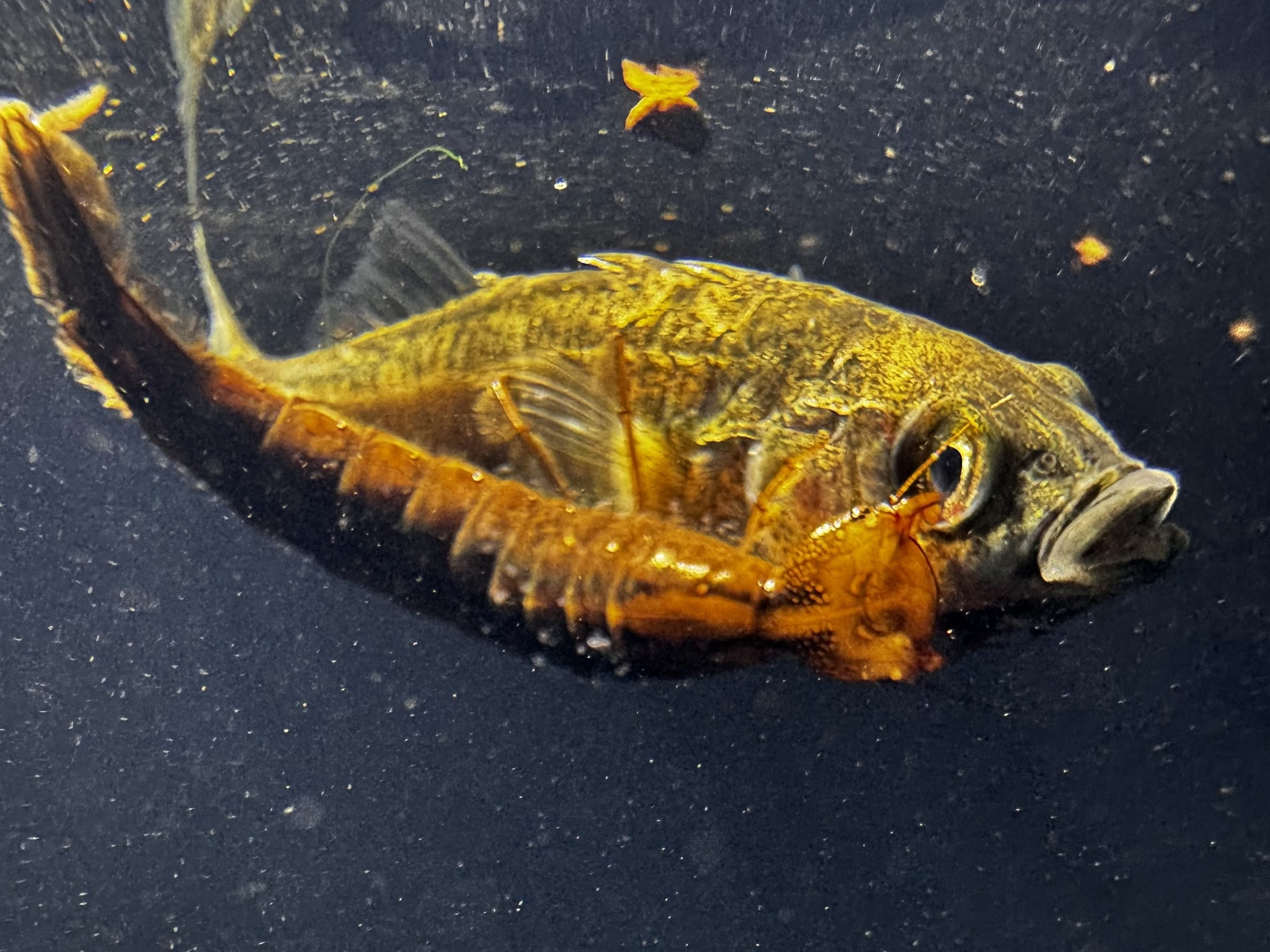
Dytiscid larva feeding on a stickleback

Similar to their wide range of habitats, Dytiscidae can be massive generalists diet-wise. Predaceous diving beetles' diet can include both invertebrates and vertebrates. The larvae, especially, take on animals with the same or bigger size, such as fish and tadpoles. Adults readily eat both living animals and carrion, making them scavengers and water cleaners. In addition, diving beetles practice cannibalism, both within their species and outside it. Since they can feed on mosquito larvae, they have a potential role in biological control of mosquito populations similar to Hydrophilidae.

== Larvae and development ==
=== Larvae ===
When still in larval form, the beetles vary in size from about 1 to 5 cm (0.39 to 1.97 in). The larval bodies are shaped like crescents, with the tail long and covered with thin hairs. Six legs protrude from along the thorax, which also sports the same thin hairs. The head is flat and square, with a pair of long, large, and pincer-like mandibles. It looks like a capsule due to its sclerotization. Larvae's eyes are stemmata rather than compound eyes like the adults. During the first instar, larvae have two egg bursters on either side of the frontoclypeus. They use these to break out of their egg.

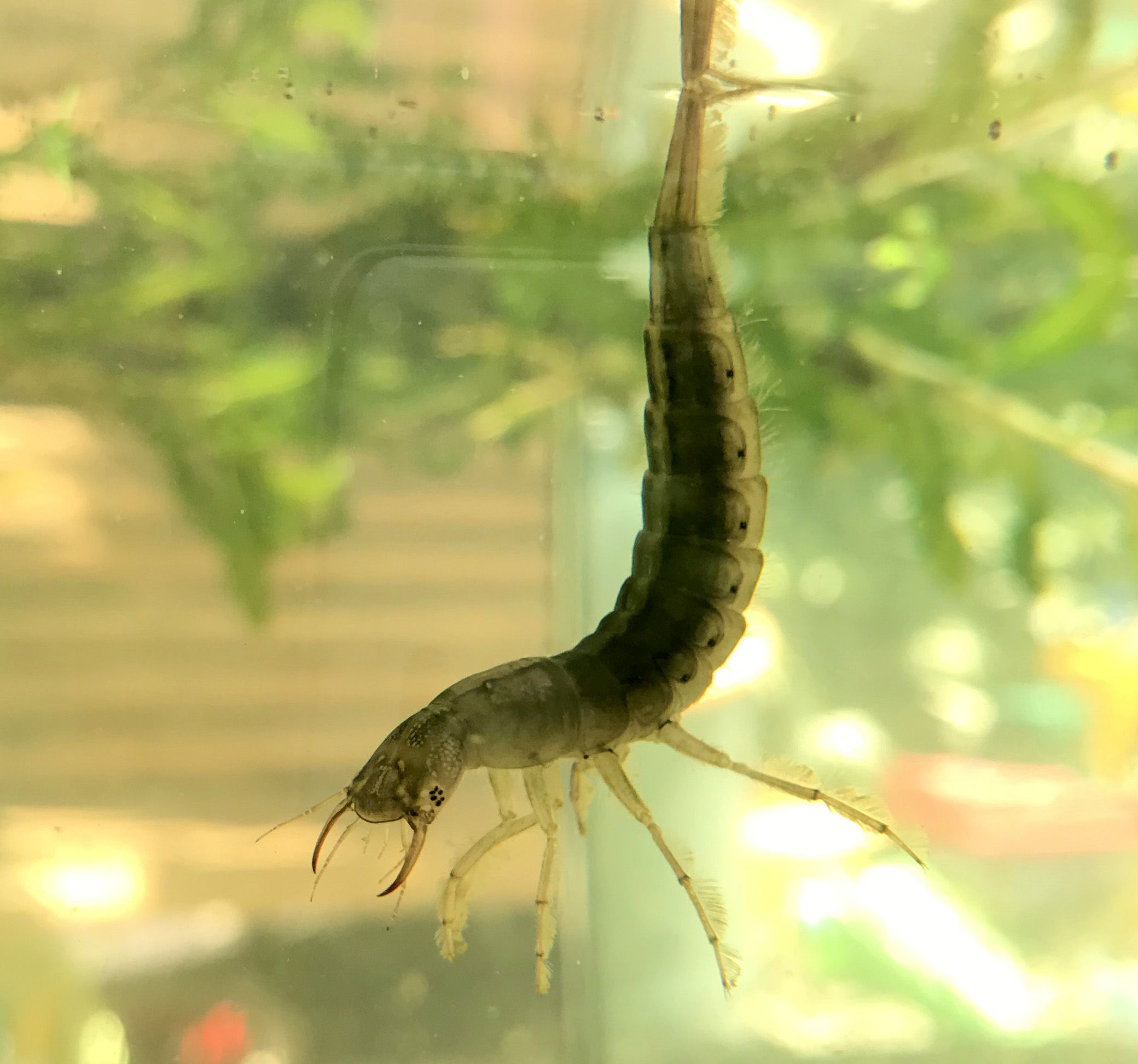
Great diving beetle (Dytiscus marginalis) larva

Along with the mandibles, the mouthpiece is also made up of a maxilla and a labium. The maxilla is further made up of a cardo, stipes, a palp of three palpomeres, and a palpiform galea. The labium has a postmentum on the base, prementum on the apex, and, attached to the prementum via a small palpiger, a pair of labial palps.

When hunting, they cling to grasses or pieces of wood along the bottom, and hold perfectly still until prey passes by, then they lunge, trapping their prey between their front legs and biting down with their pincers. The larvae are also known to partially consume prey and discard the carcass if another potential prey swims nearby. Their usual prey includes tadpoles and glassworms, among other smaller water-dwelling creatures. Larvae in many species do not eat prey through their mouth opening unlike larvae in other species and adults because it is closed. Instead they liquefy their food by injecting digestive enzymes, namely proteases, through a canal opening outward near their pincers' tip. Once the whole edible portion is in liquid form, larvae ingest it with a sucking pump traversing the pharynx and cibarium. Because they digest their food before ingesting it, they are saprobionts and digest their food extracellularly. Adults, meanwhile, bite and swallow whole small sections of their prey at a time.

The dorsal surface is usually distinctly sclerotized, like the head, but not the ventral surface. There, sclerotized plates only appear sometimes on the most posterior segments, while the rest of the surface is mostly membranous. Sclerites' pigmentation makes them often stand out from the rest of the body. The thorax has three segments, the pro-, meso-, and metathorax, whereas the subcylindrical abdomen has eight visible segments. Each of the thorax's segments have a pair of articulated legs, a large tergite and, in most specimens, a pair of smaller laterotergites associated with each leg attachment. On the abdomen, the first 1-7 are relatively uniform in appearance while segment 8 is modified for respiration in varying ways. This last segment ends in a pair of urogomphi.

Some larvae are heavier than water, while others are buoyant and have to push to stay submerged underwater. The heavier larvae mostly move through creeping and burrowing and reach the surface by climbing or swimming.

A Dytiscus marginicollis shedding into its adult form (time-lapse)

=== Development ===
As the larvae mature, they crawl from the water on the sturdy legs, and bury themselves in the mud for pupation. After about a week, or longer in some species, they emerge from the mud as adults. Adult diving beetles have been found to oviposit their eggs within frog spawn in highly ephemeral habitats, with their eggs hatching within 24 hours after the frogs and the larvae voraciously predating on the recently hatched tadpoles. Before pupating, larvae molt usually three times, correlating to their number of instars. If a flood occurs during pupation, there is a risk of drowning. Others deposit eggs in moist soil or debris by the shore, plant surfaces, or slits that they make in aquatic plant stems beneath the water. In the latter case, larvae in the first instar are usually attached to a plant and independent of surface air. For them, the plant serves as their substrate. The ability of adults to cut into plants with their ovipositor is unique to the genera Agabus, Coptotomus, Cybister, Dytiscus, Hydaticus, Ilybius, Laccophilus, and Thermonectus. This method could be superior to depositing the eggs in soil because plants typically stay moist much longer than surface soil does. In other cases, larvae diffuse oxygen throughout their body surface when underwater. The second and third instars take in surface air through a siphon at the abdomen's tip.

=== Life cycle ===
Only one generation of diving beetles tends to be born every year (univoltine). Species of diving beetles can live up to around five or several years in total. Mating season for most species spans 2 to 3 months, most often within the time of spring and autumn, since adult diving beetles in many species overwinter. In habitats where the water bed stays unfrozen, they hibernate in plant material and sediments at the bottom. Different species can also overwinter as eggs and larvae.

== Uses ==
=== Edibility ===
Adult Dytiscidae, particularly of the genus Cybister, are edible. Remnants of C. explanatus were found in prehistoric human coprolites in a Nevada cave, likely sourced from the Humboldt Sink. In Mexico, C. explanatus is eaten roasted and salted to accompany tacos. In Japan, C. japonicus has been used as food in certain regions such as Nagano prefecture. In the Guangdong Province of China, the latter species, as well as C. bengalensis, C. guerini, C. limbatus, C. sugillatus, C. tripunctatus, and probably also the well-known great diving beetle (D. marginalis) are bred for human consumption, though as they are cumbersome to raise due to their carnivorous habit and have a fairly bland (though apparently not offensive) taste and little meat, this is decreasing. Dytiscidae are reportedly also eaten in Taiwan, Thailand, and New Guinea.

== Diving beetle conservation ==
The greatest threat to diving beetles is the degradation and disappearance of their habitats due to anthropogenic activities. For example, urbanisation has led to the decreasing quantity and quality of dytiscid habitats, which consequentially has increased the distance between habitats.; thus, dytiscids may be exposed to high predation risks during dispersal. The negative effects of urbanisation on dytiscid communities can be long-lasting from the temporal perspective. Some species may go extinct across an urban landscape in a long term, resulting in further losses of urban biodiversity. Urbanisation has complex effects on the inter- and intraspecific variation in dytiscid traits. Some flight-related traits of Acilius canaliculatus and Hydaticus seminiger, such as body length and hindwing traits, were found to change along the urban gradient at different scales, whereas the traits of Ilybius ater exhibited no change.

Brownification, which refers to the change in surface water colour towards yellow–brown hues caused by recent climate change and land-use change, can also drive changes in dytiscid communities. As some species, such as Dytiscus marginalis, are tolerant to brown water, whereas some species, Hyphydrus ovatus, tend to occur in clear water, brownification may threaten dytiscid species that are intolerant to highly coloured waters. Drainage can have adverse effects on their populations. For example, species such as Rhantus bistriatus and Graphoderus bilineatus went extinct in Britain likely because of the drainage of the Whittlesea Mere. Drainage affects dytiscids mostly due to disturbing their breeding cycles, as demonstrated through how dytiscid populations dramatically increased in East Asian paddy fields. Their flourishing started after rice producers switched from the conventional method of draining the land midseason while it is flooded, to no-till.

Dytiscid adults are eaten by many birds, mammals, reptiles, and other vertebrate predators, despite their arsenal of chemical defenses. But by far the most important predator of diving beetles are fish, which limit the occurrence of most diving beetle species to fishless ponds, or to margins of aquatic habitats. Although the larvae of a few dytiscid species may become apex predators in small ponds, their presence is also often incompatible with fish. Therefore, the main focus of water beetle conservation is the protection of natural, fish-less habitats. In the European Union, two species of diving beetles are protected by the Berne Convention on the Conservation of European Wildlife and Natural Habitats, and thus serve as umbrella species for the protection of natural aquatic habitats: Dytiscus latissimus and Graphoderus bilineatus.

== Cultural significance ==
The diving beetle plays a role in a Cherokee creation story. According to the narrative, upon finding nowhere to rest in the "liquid chaos" the beetle brought up soft mud from the bottom. This mud then spread out to form all of the land on Earth.

== Ethnobiology ==
Adult Dytiscidae, as well as Gyrinidae, are collected by young girls in East Africa. It is believed that inducing the beetles to bite the nipples will stimulate breast growth. The effect of that habit has not been tested, but it is notable that the pygidial and prothoracic defense glands of diving beetles contain many types of bioactive steroids. The steroids that are operative include estrone, estradiol and testosterone. In Uganda, girls do not use Dytiscidae, but only the smaller Gyrinidae, since it is believed that the Gyrinidae are the females and the Dytiscidae are the males of the same species. Beetles in these two families are known as "yewha inat" (mother of water; Amharic የውሃ እናት) in Tanzania and rural regions of Ethiopia. For the opposite effect, young boys in Tanzania's Njombe Region use the same technique. They do so to mitigate the breast growth that can temporarily arise during the period of puberty before testosterone levels go up. Meanwhile, in other areas of East Africa such as Zimbabwe, diving beetles are an aid for boys learning to whistle. In this case, the beetle bites the tongue.

== Parasites ==
Dytiscidae are parasitised by various mites. Those in genera Dytiscacarus and Eylais live beneath the elytra of their hosts, those in genus Acherontacarus attach to the mesosternal regions and those in genus Hydrachna attach to various locations. These mites are parasitic as larvae with the exception of Dytiscacarus, which are parasitic for their entire life cycle.

== Phylogeny and evolution ==
=== Phylogeny ===
Here is a simplified cladogram based on the results of K. B. Miller and J. Bergsten's (2023) analysis of taxon gene samples using the parsimony and Bayesian models. This cladogram goes down to the level of the subfamily, and only includes the 11 that are extant. The Agabinae subfamily proved paraphyletic, therefore the relationship does not apply to some of its genera, namely Hydrotrupes and Platynectes. These two deviate away from the Agabinae + Colymbetinae grouping.

- Dytiscidae
  - Matinae
  - - - Agabinae
      - Colymbetinae
    - - Hydroporinae
      - Hydrodytinae
    - - Dytiscinae
      - Laccophilinae
      - Cybistrini
      - Copelatinae
    - - Lancetinae
    - - Coptotominae

Here is a version of the cladogram including the merely tentative relationships whose support from the analysis was not strong enough to be conclusive. These are the grouping of Lancentinae with Agabinae + Colymbetinae and Coptotominae with Hydroporinae + Hydrodytinae.

- Dytiscidae
  - Matinae
  - - - - Agabinae
        - Colymbetinae
      - - Lancetinae
    - - - Hydroporinae
        - Hydrodytinae
      - - Coptotominae
    - - Dytiscinae
      - Laccophilinae
      - Cybistrini
      - Copelatinae

=== Evolution ===
As observed in both sexually antagonistic morphology (See Shape and morphology) and behaviors, females in Dytiscidae are more selective when it comes to mating. One behavior is a technique to break the male's grip. When approached by males, females in some species make fast and erratic swimming movements. As in most insects, mating tends to be more deliberate for females because offspring have a much higher energy cost for them. With this cost comes reduced fitness to mate again. Under an evolutionary lens, an evolutionary sequence called the "arms race" explains that females first evolved resistive behaviors to minimize their losses, next males' morphology evolved palettes to stop females from escaping. Then came the females' textured dorsal surface as a counter-adaptation. So, female morphological adaptations came before behaviors according to this model. It is called the arms race because it involves either sex continuously one-upping the other's previous adaptation. According to K. B. Miller's (2002) cladistics analysis, the males' palettes originated in Dytiscinae. Five groups within Dytiscinae then evolved the female dorsal surface, each independently. Iversen et al. (2019) describe a standstill in species evolution as a byproduct of the dytiscid arms race, specifically in Graphoderus zonatus, in contrast with sexual conflict normally being associated with divergence and diversification.

There is a clear consensus that diving beetles' ancestors were terrestrial and similar to ground beetles. Testing found that the body size evolution followed a model very rare among animal groups. The model consists of an early burst period of rapid morphological change in many dytiscids transitioning from lentic to lotic habitats, then a long static period of phylogenetic conservatism. However, this early burst did not seem to correlate with any species diversification. This indicates that morphology and species diversification are uncoupled in Dytiscidae.

== Systematics ==
The following taxonomic sequence gives the subfamilies, their associated genera.

Subfamily Agabinae Thomson, 1867

- Agabinus Crotch, 1873
- Agabus Leach, 1817
- Agametrus Sharp, 1882
- Andonectes Guéorguiev, 1971
- Hydronebrius Jakovlev, 1897
- Hydrotrupes Sharp, 1882
- Ilybiosoma Crotch, 1873
- Ilybius Erichson, 1832
- Leuronectes Sharp, 1882
- Platambus Thomson, 1859
- Platynectes Régimbart, 1879

Subfamily Colymbetinae Erichson, 1837

- Anisomeria Brinck, 1943
- Senilites Brinck, 1948
- Carabdytes Balke, Hendrich & Wewalka, 1992
- Bunites Spangler, 1972
- Colymbetes Clairville, 1806
- Hoperius Fall, 1927
- Meladema Laporte, 1835
- Melanodytes Seidlitz, 1887
- Neoscutopterus J.Balfour-Browne, 1943
- Rhantus Dejean, 1833
- Rugosus García, 2001

Subfamily Copelatinae Branden, 1885

- Agaporomorphus Zimmermann, 1921
- Aglymbus Sharp, 1880
- Copelatus Erichson, 1832
- Exocelina Broun, 1886
- Lacconectus Motschulsky, 1855
- Liopterus Dejean, 1833
- Madaglymbus Shaverdo & Balke, 2008
- Rugosus García, 2001

Subfamily Coptotominae Branden, 1885

- Coptotomus Say, 1830

Subfamily Cybistrinae

- Austrodytes Watts, 1978
- Bifurcitus Brinck, 1945
- Cybister Curtis, 1827
- Nilssondytes Miller, Michat, & Ferreira Jr., 2024
- Megadytes Sharp, 1882
- Metaxydytes Miller, Michat, & Ferreira Jr., 2024
- Paramegadytes Trémouilles & Bachmann, 1980
- Onychohydrus Schaum & White, 1847
- Regimbartina Chatanay, 1911
- Spencerhydrus Sharp, 1882
- Sternhydrus Brinck, 1945
- Trifurcitus Brinck, 1945

Subfamily Dytiscinae Leach, 1815

- Acilius Leach, 1817
- Aethionectes Sharp, 1882
- Austrodytes Watts, 1978
- Dytiscus Linnaeus, 1758
- Eretes Laporte, 1833
- Graphoderus Dejean, 1833
- Hydaticus Leach, 1817
- Hyderodes Hope, 1838
- Megadytes Sharp, 1882
- Miodytiscus Wickham, 1911
- Notaticus Zimmermann, 1928
- Onychohydrus Schaum & White, 1847
- Regimbartina Chatanay, 1911
- Rhantaticus Sharp, 1880
- Sandracottus Sharp, 1882
- Spencerhydrus Sharp, 1882
- Sternhydrus Brinck, 1945
- Thermonectus Dejean, 1833
- Tikoloshanes Omer-Cooper, 1956
- †Ambarticus Yang et al. 2019 Burmese amber, Myanmar, Late Cretaceous (Cenomanian)

Subfamily Hydrodytinae K.B.Miller, 2001

- Hydrodytes K.B.Miller, 2001
- Microhydrodytes K.B.Miller, 2002

Subfamily Hydroporinae Aubé, 1836

- Africodytes Biström, 1988
- Agnoshydrus Biström, Nilsson & Wewalka, 1997
- Allodessus Guignot, 1953
- Allopachria Zimmermann, 1924
- Amarodytes Régimbart, 1900
- Amurodytes Fery & Petrov, 2013
- Andex Sharp, 1882
- Anginopachria Wewalka, Balke & Hendrich, 2001
- Anodocheilus Babington, 1841
- Antiporus Sharp, 1882
- Barretthydrus Lea, 1927
- Bidessodes Régimbart, 1895
- Bidessonotus Régimbart, 1895
- Bidessus Sharp, 1882
- Boreonectes Angus, 2010
- Borneodessus Balke, Hendrich, Mazzoldi & Biström, 2002
- Brachyvatus Zimmermann, 1919
- Brancuporus Hendrich, Toussaint & Balke, 2014
- Canthyporus Zimmermann, 1919
- Carabhydrus Watts, 1978
- Celina Aubé, 1837
- Chostonectes Sharp, 1880
- Clypeodytes Régimbart, 1894
- Coelhydrus Sharp, 1882
- Comaldessus Spangler & Barr, 1995
- Crinodessus K.B. Miller, 1997
- Darwinhydrus Sharp, 1882
- Deronectes Sharp, 1882
- Derovatellus Sharp, 1882
- Desmopachria Babington, 1841
- Dimitshydrus Uéno, 1996
- Ereboporus K.B. Miller, Gibson & Alarie, 2009
- Etruscodytes Mazza, Cianferoni & Rocchi, 2013
- Fontidessus K.B. Miller & Spangler, 2008
- Geodessus Brancucci, 1979
- Gibbidessus Watts, 1978
- Glareadessus Wewalka & Biström, 1998
- Graptodytes Seidlitz, 1887
- Haideoporus Young & Longley, 1976
- Hemibidessus Zimmermann, 1921
- Heroceras Guignot, 1949
- Herophydrus Sharp, 1880
- Heterhydrus Fairmaire, 1869
- Heterosternuta Strand, 1935
- Hovahydrus Biström, 1982
- Huxelhydrus Sharp, 1882
- Hydrocolus Roughley & Larson in Larson, Alarie & Roughley, 2000
- Hydrodessus J. Balfour-Browne, 1953
- Hydroglyphus Motschulsky, 1853
- Hydropeplus Sharp, 1882
- Hydroporus Clairville, 1806
- Hydrovatus Motschulsky, 1853
- Hygrotus Stephens, 1828
- Hyphoporus Sharp, 1880
- Hyphovatus Wewalka & Biström, 1994
- Hyphydrus Illiger, 1802
- Hypodessus Guignot, 1939
- Iberoporus Castro & Delgado, 2001
- Incomptodessus K.B. Miller & García, 2011
- Kakadudessus Hendrich & Balke, 2009
- Kuschelydrus Ordish, 1976
- Laccornellus Roughley & Wolfe, 1987
- Laccornis Gozis, 1914
- Leiodytes Guignot, 1936
- Limbodessus Guignot, 1939
- Liodessus Guignot, 1939
- Lioporeus Guignot, 1950
- Megaporus Brinck, 1943
- Metaporus Guignot, 1945
- Methles Sharp, 1882
- Microdessus Young, 1967
- Microdytes J. Balfour-Browne, 1946
- Morimotoa Uéno, 1957
- Nebrioporus Régimbart, 1906
- Necterosoma W.J. Macleay, 1871
- Neobidessodes Hendrich & Balke, 2009
- Neobidessus Young, 1967
- Neoclypeodytes Young, 1967
- Neoporus Guignot, 1931
- Oreodytes Seidlitz, 1887
- Pachydrus Sharp, 1882
- Pachynectes Régimbart, 1903
- Papuadessus Balke, 2001
- Paroster Sharp, 1882
- Peschetius Guignot, 1942
- Petrodessus K.B. Miller, 2012
- Phreatodessus Ordish, 1976
- Platydytes Biström, 1988
- Porhydrus Guignot, 1945
- Primospes Sharp, 1882
- Pseuduvarus Biström, 1988
- Psychopomporus Jean, Telles & K.B. Miller, 2012
- Pteroporus Guignot, 1933
- Queda Sharp, 1882
- Rhithrodytes Bameul, 1989
- Sanfilippodytes Franciscolo, 1979
- Scarodytes Gozis, 1914
- Schistomerus Palmer, 1957
- Sekaliporus Watts, 1997
- Sharphydrus Omer-Cooper, 1958
- Siamoporus Spangler, 1996
- Siettitia Abeille de Perrin, 1904
- Sinodytes Spangler, 1996
- Spanglerodessus K.B. Miller & García, 2011
- Sternopriscus Sharp, 1880
- Stictonectes Brinck, 1943
- Stictotarsus Zimmermann, 1919
- Stygoporus Larson & LaBonte, 1994
- Suphrodytes Gozis, 1914
- Tepuidessus Spangler, 1981
- Terradessus Watts, 1982
- Tiporus Watts, 1985
- Trichonectes Guignot, 1941
- Trogloguignotus Sanfilippo, 1958
- Tyndallhydrus Sharp, 1882
- Typhlodessus Brancucci, 1985
- Uvarus Guignot, 1939
- Vatellus Aubé, 1837
- Yola Gozis, 1886
- Yolina Guignot, 1936
- † Calicovatellus K.B. Miller & Lubkin, 2001
- † Procoelambus Théobald, 1937

Subfamily Laccophilinae Gistel, 1856

- Africophilus Guignot, 1948
- Agabetes Crotch, 1873
- Australphilus Watts, 1978
- Japanolaccophilus Satô, 1972
- Laccodytes Régimbart, 1895
- Laccophilus Leach, 1815
- Laccoporus J. Balfour-Browne, 1939
- Laccosternus Brancucci, 1983
- Napodytes Steiner, 1981
- Neptosternus Sharp, 1882
- Philaccolilus Guignot, 1937
- Philaccolus Guignot, 1937
- Philodytes J. Balfour-Browne, 1939

Subfamily Lancetinae Branden, 1885

- Lancetes Sharp, 1882

Subfamily Matinae Branden, 1885

- Allomatus Mouchamps, 1964
- Batrachomatus Clark, 1863
- Matus Aubé, 1836

Subfamily †Liadytiscinae Prokin & Ren, 2010

- † Liadroporus Prokin & Ren, 2010 Yixian Formation, China, Early Cretaceous (Aptian)
- † Liadytiscus Prokin & Ren, 2010 Yixian Formation, China, Aptian
- † Mesoderus Prokin & Ren, 2010 Yixian Formation, China, Aptian
- † Liadyxianus Prokin, Petrov, B. Wang & Ponomarenko, 2013 Yixian Formation, China, Aptian
- † Mesodytes Prokin, Petrov, Wang & Ponomarenko, 2013 Yixian Formation, China, Aptian

Subfamily Incertae sedis

- † Cretodytes Ponomarenko, 1977 Doronino Formation, Russia, Early Cretaceous (Barremian), Kzyl-Zhar, Kazakhstan, Late Cretaceous (Turonian)
- † Palaeodytes Ponomarenko, 1987 Karabastau Formation, Kazakhstan, Late Jurassic (Oxfordian), Zaza Formation, Russia, Aptian
- † "Palaeodytes" incompletus Ponomarenko, Coram & Jarzembowski, 2005 Durlston Formation, United Kingdom, Early Cretaceous (Berriasian) (undescribed genus)
- † Sinoporus Prokin & Ren, 2010 Yixian Formation, China, Aptian
