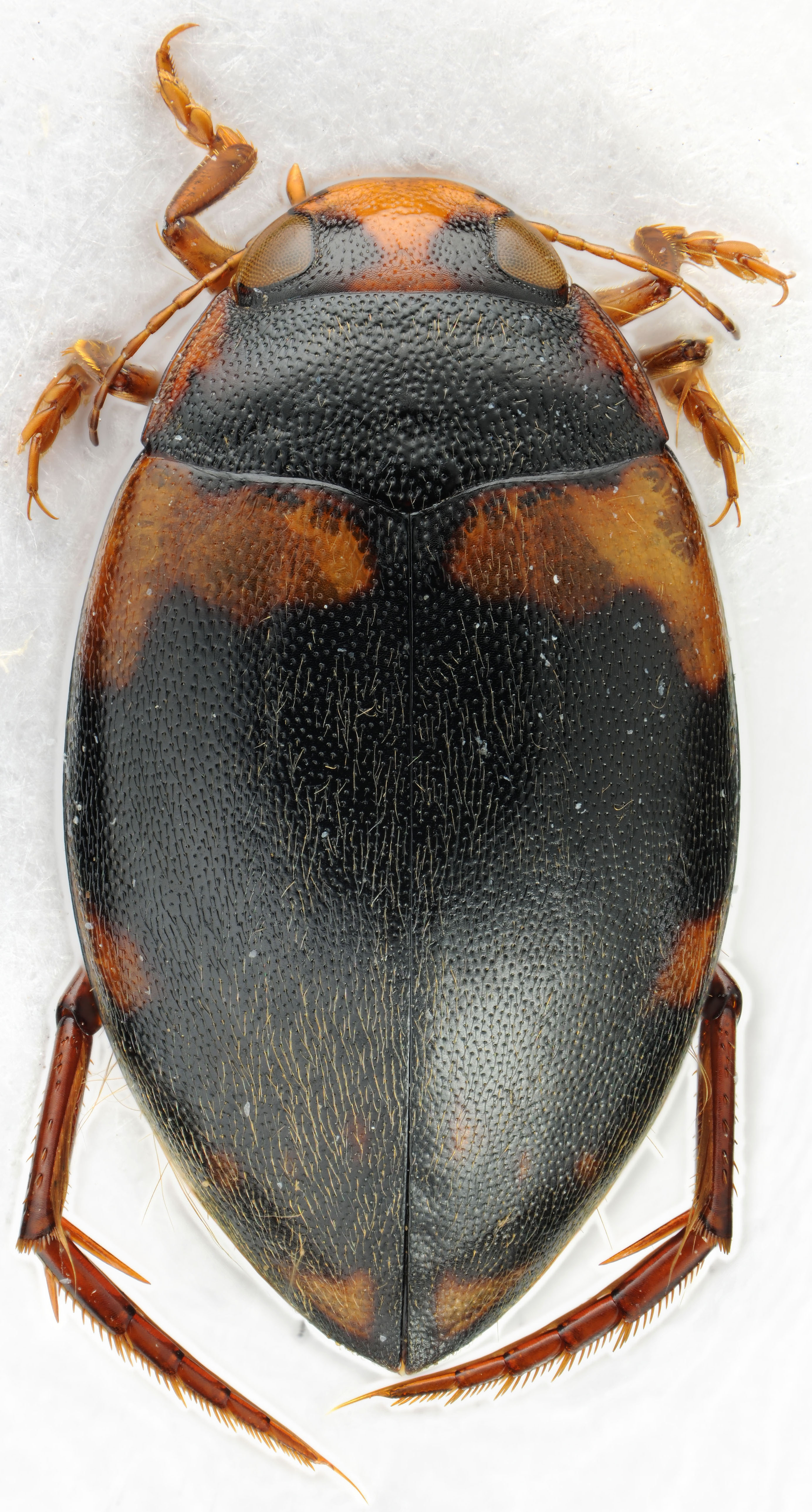
- Chostonectes gigas

Scientific classification
- Kingdom: Animalia
- Phylum: Arthropoda
- Class: Insecta
- Order: Coleoptera
- Suborder: Adephaga
- Family: Dytiscidae
- Genus: Chostonectes; Sharp, 1882

= Chostonectes =

Genus of beetles

Chostonectes is a genus of beetles in the family Dytiscidae, containing the following species:

- Chostonectes gigas (Boheman, 1858)
- Chostonectes johnsonii (Clark, 1862)
- Chostonectes maai Balke, 1995
- Chostonectes nebulosus (W.J. Macleay, 1871)
- Chostonectes sharpi Sharp, 1882
- Chostonectes wattsi Wewalka, 1994
