= Lancetes =

Scientific classification
- Kingdom: Animalia
- Phylum: Arthropoda
- Class: Insecta
- Order: Coleoptera
- Suborder: Adephaga
- Family: Dytiscidae
- Subfamily: Lancetinae; Branden, 1885
- Tribe: Lancetini; Branden, 1885
- Genus: Lancetes; Sharp, 1882

Genus of beetles

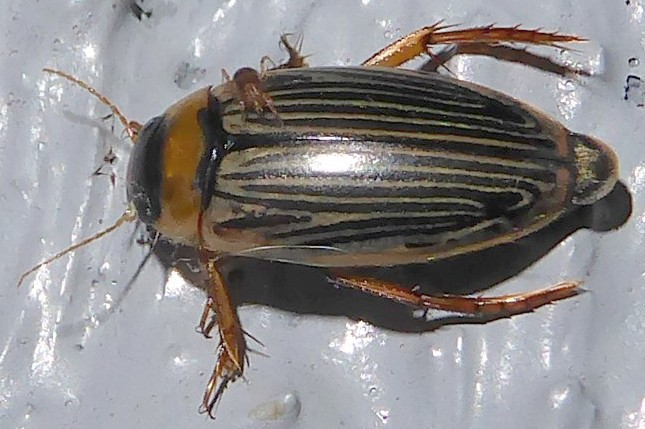

Lancetes is a genus of predaceous diving beetles in the family Dytiscidae, the only member of the subfamily Lancetinae. There are more than 20 described species in Lancetes, found in Australasia and the Neotropics. One species, Lancetes angusticollis, is found in South Georgia and is the world's most southerly diving beetle.

== Species ==
These 22 species belong to the genus Lancetes:

- Lancetes angusticollis (Curtis, 1839)
- Lancetes arauco Bachmann & Trémouilles, 1981
- Lancetes backstromi Zimmermann, 1924
- Lancetes biremis Ríha, 1961
- Lancetes borellii Griffini, 1895
- Lancetes dacunhae Brinck, 1948
- Lancetes delkeskampi Ríha, 1961
- Lancetes falklandicus Ríha, 1961
- Lancetes flavipes Zimmermann, 1924
- Lancetes flavoscutatus Enderlein, 1912
- Lancetes immarginatus Zimmermann, 1924
- Lancetes lanceolatus (Clark, 1863)
- Lancetes marginatus (Steinheil, 1869)
- Lancetes mixtus (C.O. Waterhouse, 1881)
- Lancetes nigriceps (Erichson, 1834)
- Lancetes praemorsus (Erichson, 1834)
- Lancetes subseriatus Zimmermann, 1924
- Lancetes tarsalis Ríha, 1961
- Lancetes theresae Sharp, 1902
- Lancetes towianicus Zimmermann, 1924
- Lancetes varius (Fabricius, 1775)
- Lancetes waterhousei Griffini, 1895
