= Phreatodessus =

Scientific classification
- Kingdom: Animalia
- Phylum: Arthropoda
- Class: Insecta
- Order: Coleoptera
- Suborder: Adephaga
- Family: Dytiscidae
- Genus: Phreatodessus; Ordish, 1976

Genus of beetles

Phreatodessus is a genus of beetles in the family Dytiscidae, containing the following species:

- Phreatodessus hades Ordish, 1976
- Phreatodessus pluto Ordish, 1991
