= Terradessus =

Scientific classification
- Kingdom: Animalia
- Phylum: Arthropoda
- Class: Insecta
- Order: Coleoptera
- Suborder: Adephaga
- Family: Dytiscidae
- Genus: Terradessus; Watts, 1982

Genus of beetles

Terradessus is a genus of beetles in the family Dytiscidae, containing the following species:

- Terradessus anophthalmus Brancucci & Monteith, 1997
- Terradessus caecus Watts, 1982
