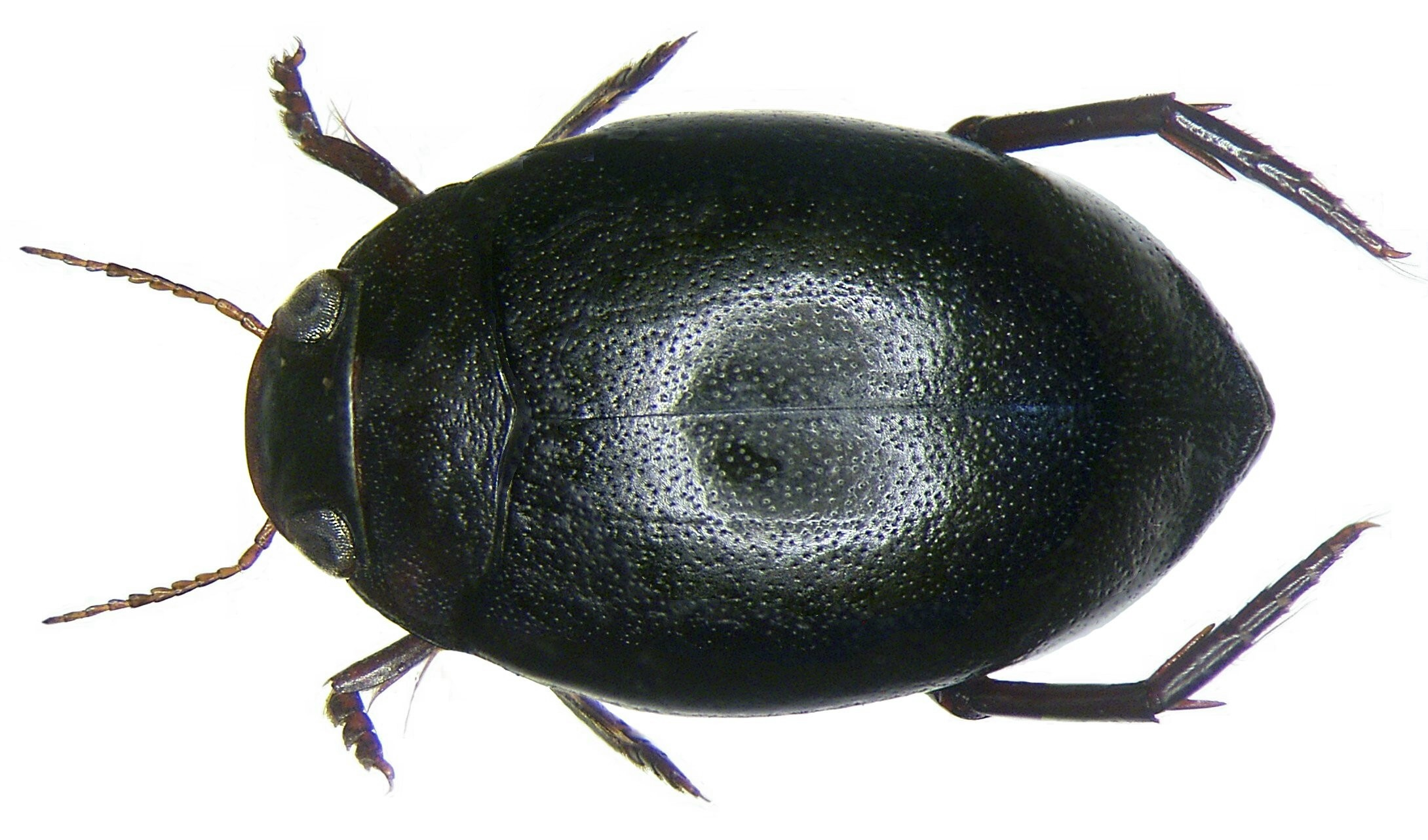
- Heterhydrus agaboides

Scientific classification
- Kingdom: Animalia
- Phylum: Arthropoda
- Class: Insecta
- Order: Coleoptera
- Suborder: Adephaga
- Family: Dytiscidae
- Genus: Heterhydrus; Fairmaire, 1869

= Heterhydrus =

Genus of beetles

Heterhydrus is a genus of beetles in the family Dytiscidae, containing the following species:

- Heterhydrus adipatus Guignot, 1952
- Heterhydrus agaboides Fairmaire, 1869
- Heterhydrus ghanensis Wewalka, 1980
- Heterhydrus senegalensis (Laporte, 1835)
- Heterhydrus sudanensis Zimmermann, 1927
