= Hyphovatus =

Scientific classification
- Kingdom: Animalia
- Phylum: Arthropoda
- Class: Insecta
- Order: Coleoptera
- Suborder: Adephaga
- Family: Dytiscidae
- Genus: Hyphovatus; Wewalka & Biström, 1994

Genus of beetles

Hyphovatus is a genus of beetles in the family Dytiscidae, containing the following species:

- Hyphovatus dismorphus (Biström, 1984)
- Hyphovatus manfredi Wewalka & Biström, 1994
- Hyphovatus prapatensis Wewalka & Biström, 1994
