= Amurodytes =

Scientific classification
- Domain: Eukaryota
- Kingdom: Animalia
- Phylum: Arthropoda
- Class: Insecta
- Order: Coleoptera
- Suborder: Adephaga
- Family: Dytiscidae
- Tribe: Hydroporini
- Genus: Amurodytes; Fery & Petrov, 2013
- Species: A. belovi

Binomial name
- Amurodytes belovi Fery & Petrov, 2013

Genus of insects

Amurodytes is a genus of predaceous diving beetles in the family Dytiscidae. There is one described species in Amurodytes, A. belovi, found in the Palearctic.
