= Brancuporus =

Scientific classification
- Kingdom: Animalia
- Phylum: Arthropoda
- Class: Insecta
- Order: Coleoptera
- Suborder: Adephaga
- Family: Dytiscidae
- Subfamily: Hydroporinae
- Tribe: Hydroporini
- Genus: Brancuporus; Hendrich, Toussaint & Balke, 2014

Genus of beetles

Brancuporus is a genus of predaceous diving beetles in the family Dytiscidae. There are at least two described species in Brancuporus. They are found in Australasia.

== Species ==
These two species belong to the genus Brancuporus:

- Brancuporus gottwaldi (Hendrich, 2001)
- Brancuporus pennifoldae (Watts & Pinder, 2000)
