= Sternhydrus =

Scientific classification
- Kingdom: Animalia
- Phylum: Arthropoda
- Class: Insecta
- Order: Coleoptera
- Suborder: Adephaga
- Family: Dytiscidae
- Genus: Sternhydrus; Brinck, 1945

Genus of beetles

Sternhydrus is a genus of beetles in the family Dytiscidae. They are found in Australia, New Guinea, and Buru Island. The genus contains the following four species:

- Sternhydrus atratus (Fabricius, 1801)
- Sternhydrus gibbosus (Wilke, 1920)
- Sternhydrus kolbei (Wilke, 1920)
- Sternhydrus toxopei (Zimmermann, 1925)
