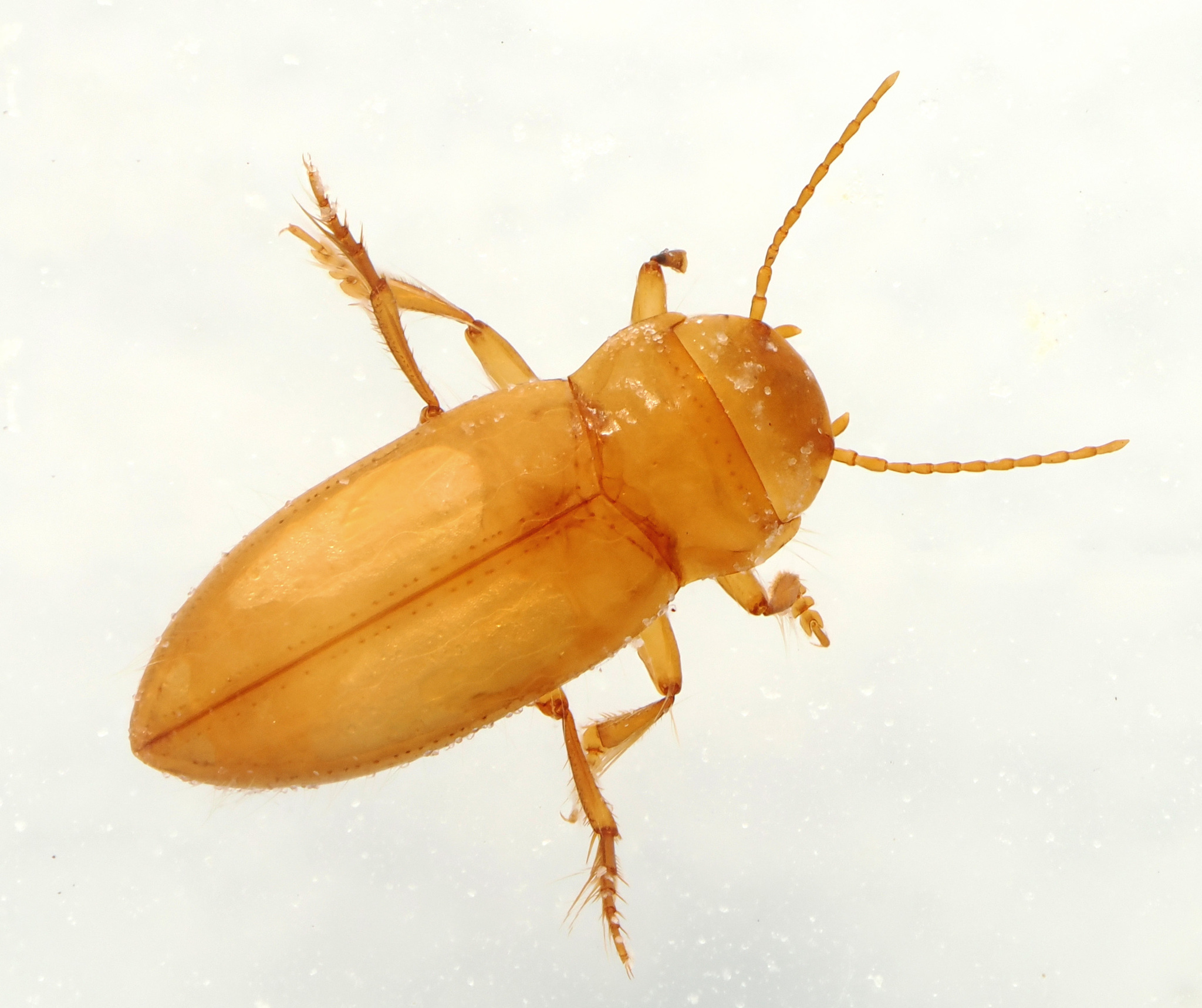

Scientific classification
- Kingdom: Animalia
- Phylum: Arthropoda
- Clade: Pancrustacea
- Class: Insecta
- Order: Coleoptera
- Suborder: Adephaga
- Family: Dytiscidae
- Genus: Haideoporus; Young & Longley, 1976
- Species: H. texanus

Binomial name
- Haideoporus texanus Young & Longley, 1976

= Haideoporus =

Haideoporus texanus

Genus of beetles

Haideoporus is a genus of beetles in the family Dytiscidae. It is monotypic, being represented by the single species Haideoporus texanus.
