= Scarodytes =

Scientific classification
- Kingdom: Animalia
- Phylum: Arthropoda
- Class: Insecta
- Order: Coleoptera
- Suborder: Adephaga
- Family: Dytiscidae
- Genus: Scarodytes; Gozis, 1914

Genus of beetles

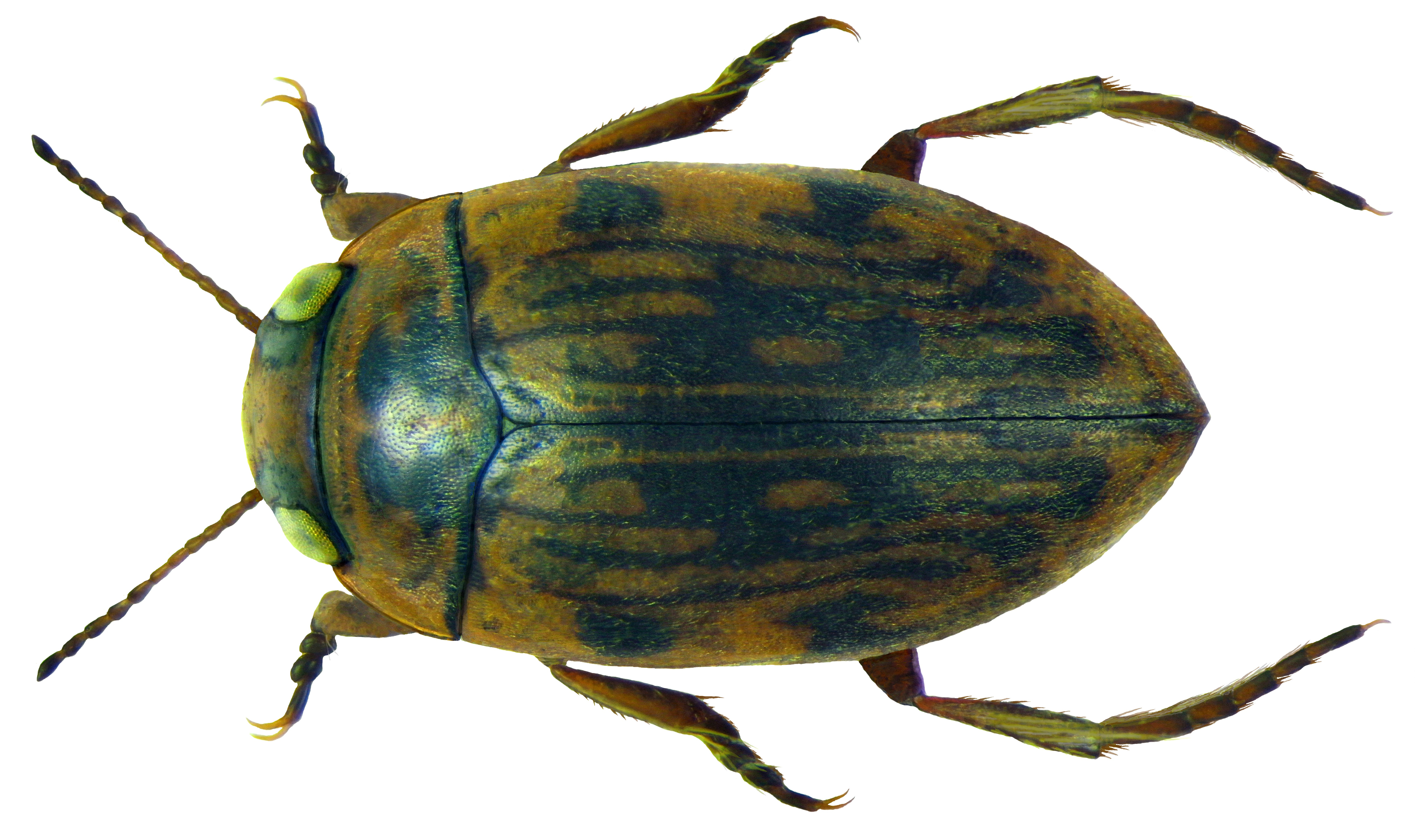
Scarodytes halensis (Fabricius, 1787

Scarodytes is a genus of beetles in the family Dytiscidae, containing the following species:

- Scarodytes halensis (Fabricius, 1787)
- Scarodytes malickyi Wewalka, 1977
- Scarodytes margaliti Wewalka, 1977
- Scarodytes nigriventris (Zimmermann, 1919)
- Scarodytes pederzanii Angelini, 1973
- Scarodytes ruffoi Franciscolo, 1961
- Scarodytes savinensis (Zimmermann, 1933)
