= Psychopomporus =

Scientific classification
- Domain: Eukaryota
- Kingdom: Animalia
- Phylum: Arthropoda
- Class: Insecta
- Order: Coleoptera
- Suborder: Adephaga
- Family: Dytiscidae
- Tribe: Hydroporini
- Genus: Psychopomporus; Jean, Telles & K.B. Miller, 2012
- Species: P. felipi

Binomial name
- Psychopomporus felipi Jean, Telles & K.B. Miller, 2012

Genus of beetles

Psychopomporus is a genus of predaceous diving beetles in the family Dytiscidae. There is one described species in Psychopomporus, P. felipi, found in North America.
