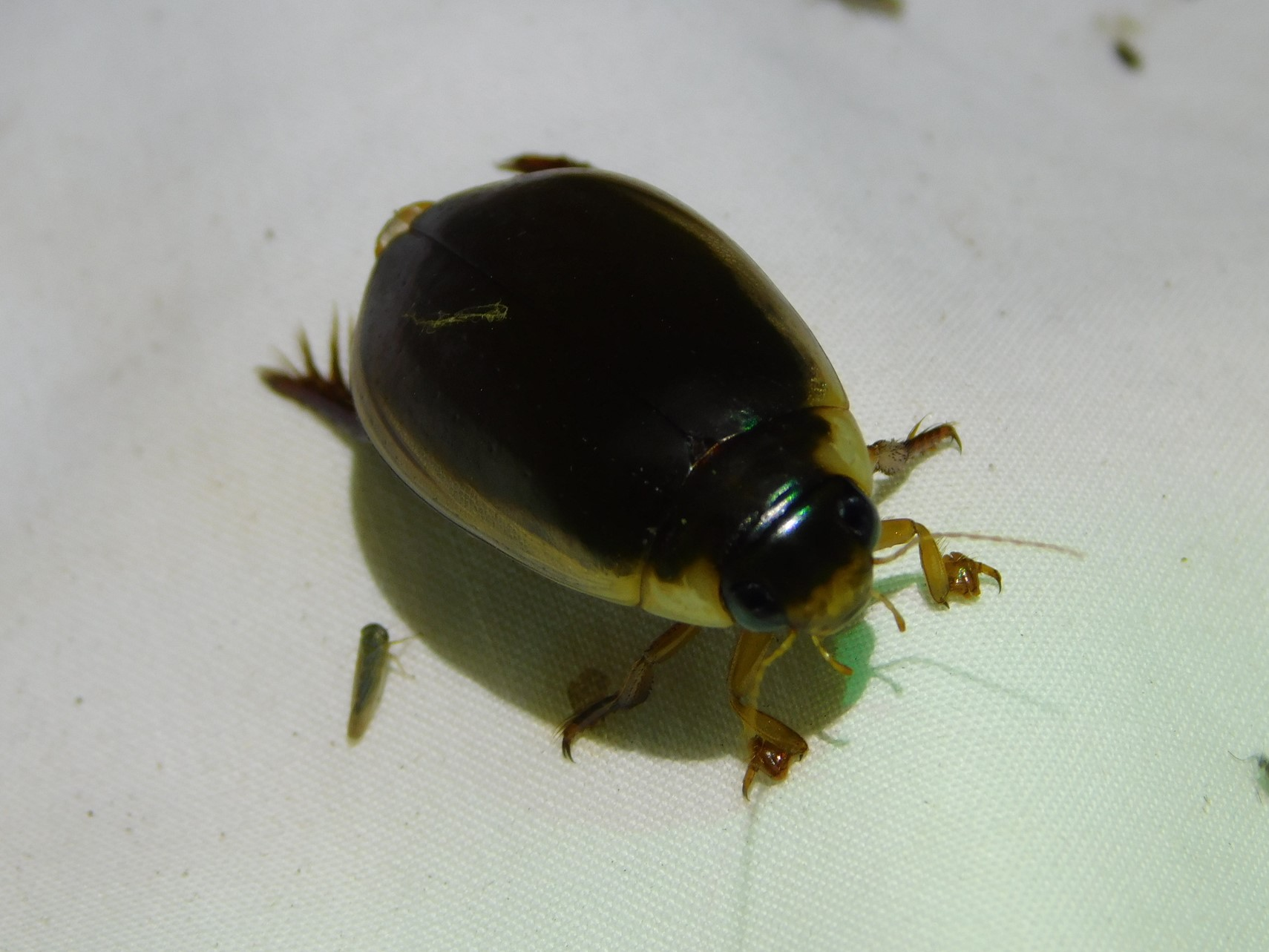
- Onychohydrus scutellaris

Scientific classification
- Domain: Eukaryota
- Kingdom: Animalia
- Phylum: Arthropoda
- Class: Insecta
- Order: Coleoptera
- Suborder: Adephaga
- Family: Dytiscidae
- Genus: Onychohydrus; Schaum & White, 1847

= Onychohydrus =

Genus of beetles

Onychohydrus is a genus of beetles in the family Dytiscidae. The genus is found in Australia, Tasmania, and New Zealand's North Island. The genus consists of these two species:

- Onychohydrus hookeri (White, 1846)
- Onychohydrus scutellaris (Germar, 1848)
