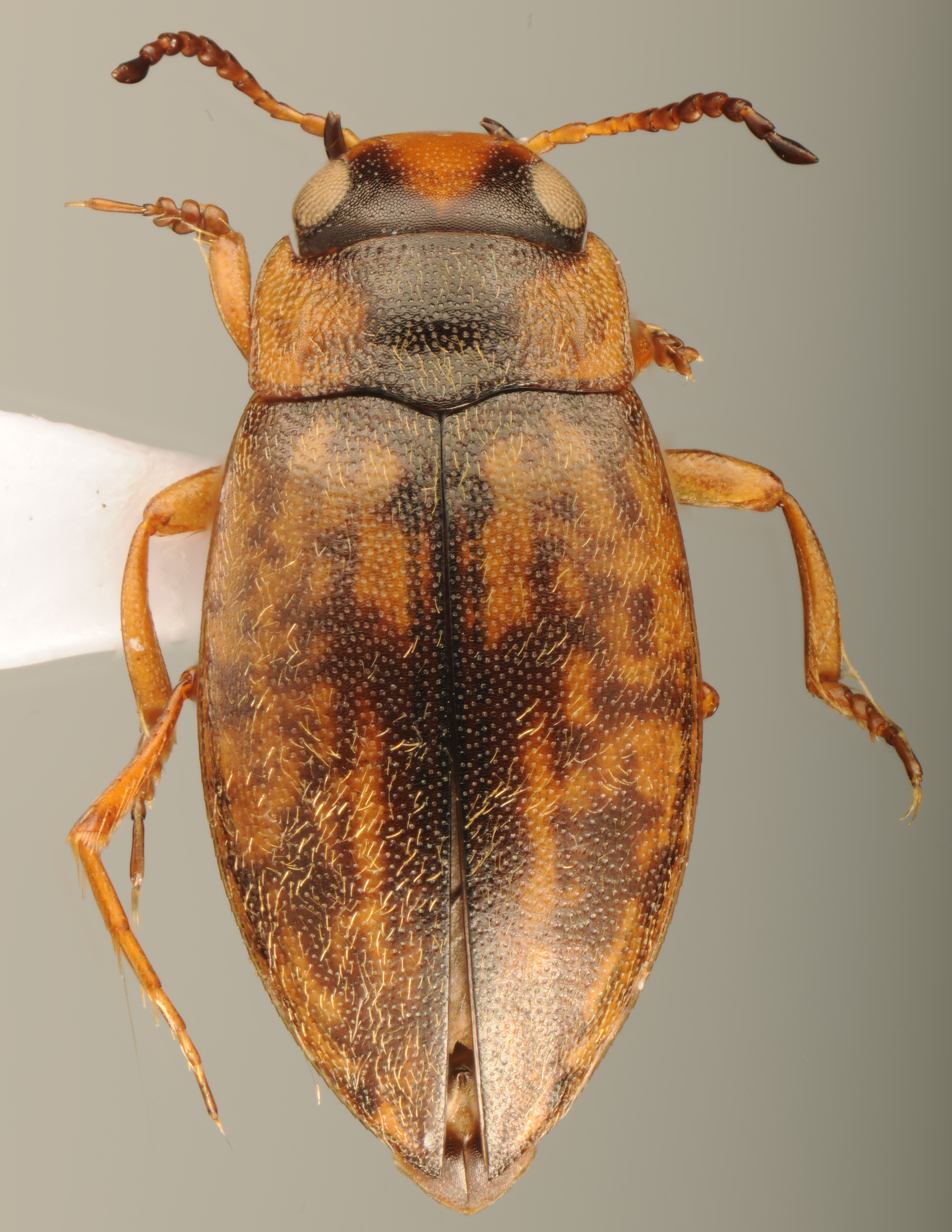
- Sternopriscus multimaculatus

Scientific classification
- Kingdom: Animalia
- Phylum: Arthropoda
- Class: Insecta
- Order: Coleoptera
- Suborder: Adephaga
- Family: Dytiscidae
- Genus: Sternopriscus; Sharp, 1882

= Sternopriscus =

Genus of beetles

Sternopriscus is a genus of beetles in the family Dytiscidae, containing the following species:

- Sternopriscus alligatorensis Hendrich & Watts, 2004
- Sternopriscus alpinus Hendrich & Watts, 2004
- Sternopriscus aquilonaris Hendrich & Watts, 2004
- Sternopriscus balkei Hendrich & Watts, 2004
- Sternopriscus barbarae Hendrich & Watts, 2004
- Sternopriscus browni Sharp, 1882
- Sternopriscus clavatus Sharp, 1882
- Sternopriscus eikei Hendrich & Watts, 2007
- Sternopriscus emmae Hendrich & Watts, 2007
- Sternopriscus goldbergi Hendrich & Watts, 2004
- Sternopriscus hansardii (Clark, 1862)
- Sternopriscus marginatus Watts, 1978
- Sternopriscus meadfootii (Clark, 1862)
- Sternopriscus minimus Lea, 1899
- Sternopriscus montanus Watts, 1978
- Sternopriscus mouchampsi Hendrich & Watts, 2004
- Sternopriscus multimaculatus (Clark, 1862)
- Sternopriscus mundanus Watts, 1978
- Sternopriscus pilbaraensis Hendrich & Watts, 2004
- Sternopriscus signatus Sharp, 1882
- Sternopriscus storeyi Hendrich & Watts, 2004
- Sternopriscus tarsalis Sharp, 1882
- Sternopriscus tasmanicus Sharp, 1882
- Sternopriscus wallumphilia Hendrich & Watts, 2004
- Sternopriscus wattsi Pederzani, 1999
- Sternopriscus weckwerthi Hendrich & Watts, 2004
- Sternopriscus wehnckei Sharp, 1882
- Sternopriscus weiri Hendrich & Watts, 2004
- Sternopriscus williamsi Hendrich & Watts, 2007
