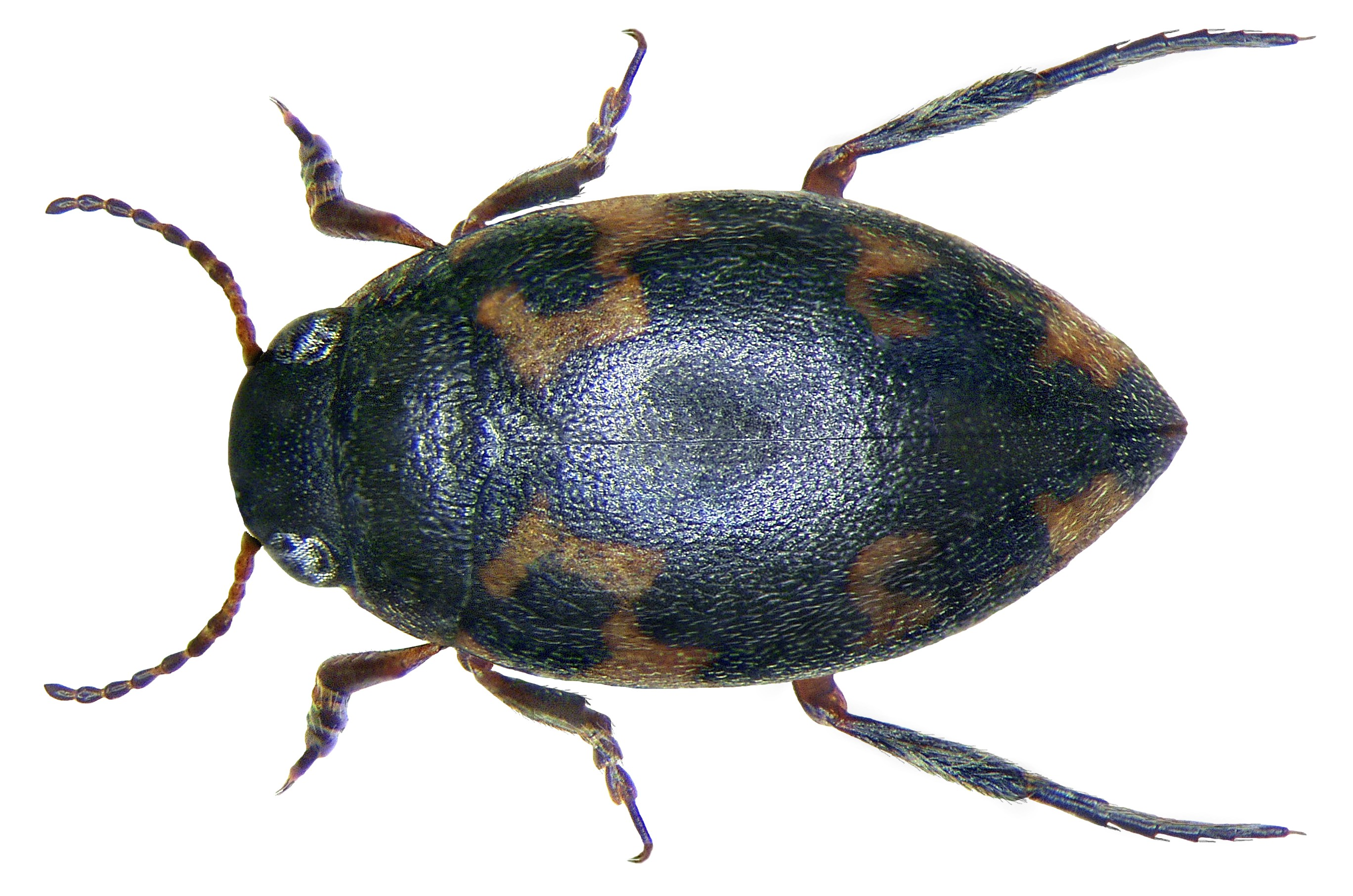
- Stictonectes lepidus

Scientific classification
- Kingdom: Animalia
- Phylum: Arthropoda
- Class: Insecta
- Order: Coleoptera
- Suborder: Adephaga
- Family: Dytiscidae
- Genus: Stictonectes; Brinck, 1943

= Stictonectes =

Genus of beetles

Stictonectes is a genus of beetles in the family Dytiscidae, containing the following species:

- Stictonectes azruensis (Théry, 1933)
- Stictonectes canariensis Machado, 1987
- Stictonectes epipleuricus (Seidlitz, 1887)
- Stictonectes escheri (Aubé, 1838)
- Stictonectes formosus (Aubé, 1838)
- Stictonectes lepidus (Olivier, 1795)
- Stictonectes occidentalis Fresneda & Fery, 1990
- Stictonectes optatus (Seidlitz, 1887)
- Stictonectes rufulus (Aubé, 1838)
- Stictonectes samai Schizzerotto, 1988
