= Regimbartina =

Scientific classification
- Domain: Eukaryota
- Kingdom: Animalia
- Phylum: Arthropoda
- Class: Insecta
- Order: Coleoptera
- Suborder: Adephaga
- Family: Dytiscidae
- Tribe: Cybistrini
- Genus: Regimbartina; Chatanay, 1911
- Species: R. pruinosa

Binomial name
- Regimbartina pruinosa (Régimbart, 1895)

Genus of beetles

Regimbartina is a genus of predaceous diving beetles in the family Dytiscidae. This genus has a single species, Regimbartina pruinosa.

The known distribution of this species is in Cameroon, Angola, and Gabon.
