= Hovahydrus =

Scientific classification
- Kingdom: Animalia
- Phylum: Arthropoda
- Class: Insecta
- Order: Coleoptera
- Suborder: Adephaga
- Family: Dytiscidae
- Genus: Hovahydrus; Biström, 1982

Genus of beetles

Hovahydrus is a genus of beetles in the family Dytiscidae, containing the following species:

- Hovahydrus minutissimus (Régimbart, 1903)
- Hovahydrus perrieri (Fairmaire, 1898)
- Hovahydrus praetextus (Guignot, 1951)
- Hovahydrus sinapi (Guignot, 1955)
