= Allopachria =

Scientific classification
- Kingdom: Animalia
- Phylum: Arthropoda
- Class: Insecta
- Order: Coleoptera
- Suborder: Adephaga
- Family: Dytiscidae
- Genus: Allopachria; Zimmermann, 1924

Genus of beetles

Allopachria is a genus of beetles in the family Dytiscidae, containing the following species:

- Allopachria abnormipenis Wewalka, 2000
- Allopachria balkei Wewalka, 2000
- Allopachria beeri Wewalka, 2000
- Allopachria bimaculata (Satô, 1972)
- Allopachria dieterleorum Wewalka, 2000
- Allopachria dudgeoni Wewalka, 2000
- Allopachria ernsti Wewalka, 2000
- Allopachria flavomaculata (Kamiya, 1838)
- Allopachria friedrichi Wewalka, 2000
- Allopachria froehlichi Wewalka, 2000
- Allopachria guidettii Wewalka, 2000
- Allopachria hautmannorum Wewalka, 2000
- Allopachria hendrichi Wewalka, 2000
- Allopachria holmeni Wewalka, 2000
- Allopachria jaechi Wewalka, 2000
- Allopachria jendeki Wewalka, 2000
- Allopachria jilanzhui Wewalka, 2000
- Allopachria kodadai Wewalka, 2000
- Allopachria liselotteae Wewalka, 2000
- Allopachria quadrimaculata (Satô, 1981)
- Allopachria quadripustulata Zimmermann, 1924
- Allopachria sausai Wewalka, 2000
- Allopachria schillhammeri Wewalka, 2000
- Allopachria schoenmanni Wewalka, 2000
- Allopachria scholzorum Wewalka, 2000
- Allopachria schramhauserorum Wewalka, 2000
- Allopachria shepardi Wewalka, 2000
- Allopachria taiwana (Satô, 1990)
- Allopachria umbrosa Zimmermann, 1927
- Allopachria vietnamica (Satô, 1995)
- Allopachria wangi Wewalka & Nilsson, 1994
- Allopachria weinbergerorum Wewalka, 2000
- Allopachria zetteli Wewalka, 2000
