= Heroceras =

Heroceras descarpentriesi

Scientific classification
- Kingdom: Animalia
- Phylum: Arthropoda
- Class: Insecta
- Order: Coleoptera
- Suborder: Adephaga
- Family: Dytiscidae
- Genus: Heroceras; Guignot, 1950
- Species: H. descarpentriesi

Binomial name
- Heroceras descarpentriesi (Peschet, 1923)

Genus of beetles

Heroceras descarpentriesi is a species of beetle in the family Dytiscidae, the only species in the genus Heroceras.
