= Laccosternus =

Laccosternus grouvellei

Scientific classification
- Kingdom: Animalia
- Phylum: Arthropoda
- Class: Insecta
- Order: Coleoptera
- Suborder: Adephaga
- Family: Dytiscidae
- Genus: Laccosternus; Brancucci, 1983
- Species: L. grouvellei

Binomial name
- Laccosternus grouvellei (Régimbart, 1895)

Genus of beetles

Laccosternus grouvellei is a species of beetle in the family Dytiscidae, the only species in the genus Laccosternus.
