= Africophilus =

Scientific classification
- Kingdom: Animalia
- Phylum: Arthropoda
- Class: Insecta
- Order: Coleoptera
- Suborder: Adephaga
- Family: Dytiscidae
- Genus: Africophilus; Guignot, 1948

Genus of beetles

Africophilus is a genus of beetles in the family Dytiscidae, containing the following species:

- Africophilus bartolozzii Rocchi, 1991
- Africophilus basilewskyi Bilardo, 1976
- Africophilus cesii Sanfilippo & Franciscolo, 1988
- Africophilus congener Omer-Cooper, 1969
- Africophilus differens Omer-Cooper, 1969
- Africophilus inopinatus Guignot, 1948
- Africophilus jansei Omer-Cooper & Joseph Omer-Cooper, 1957
- Africophilus josi Omer-Cooper, 1969
- Africophilus montalentii Sanfilippo & Franciscolo, 1988
- Africophilus nesiotes Guignot, 1951
- Africophilus omercooperae Franciscolo, 1994
- Africophilus pauliani Legros, 1950
- Africophilus sanfilippoi Franciscolo, 1994
- Africophilus sinuaticauda Franciscolo, 1994
- Africophilus stoltzei Holmen, 1985
- Africophilus uzungwai Holmen, 1985
- Africophilus walterrossii Sanfilippo & Franciscolo, 1988
