= Australphilus =

Scientific classification
- Kingdom: Animalia
- Phylum: Arthropoda
- Class: Insecta
- Order: Coleoptera
- Suborder: Adephaga
- Family: Dytiscidae
- Genus: Australphilus; Watts, 1978

Genus of beetles

Australphilus is a genus of beetles in the family Dytiscidae, first described in 1978 by Chris Watts, containing the following species:

- Australphilus montanus Watts, 1978
- Australphilus saltus Watts, 1978
