= Napodytes =

Napodytes boki

Scientific classification
- Kingdom: Animalia
- Phylum: Arthropoda
- Class: Insecta
- Order: Coleoptera
- Suborder: Adephaga
- Family: Dytiscidae
- Genus: Napodytes; Steiner, 1981
- Species: N. boki

Binomial name
- Napodytes boki Steiner, 1981

Genus of beetles

Napodytes boki is a species of beetle in the family Dytiscidae, the only species in the genus Napodytes.
