= Philaccolus =

Scientific classification
- Kingdom: Animalia
- Phylum: Arthropoda
- Class: Insecta
- Order: Coleoptera
- Suborder: Adephaga
- Family: Dytiscidae
- Genus: Philaccolus; Guignot, 1937

Genus of beetles

Philaccolus is a genus of beetles in the family Dytiscidae, containing the following species:

- Philaccolus elongatus (Régimbart, 1903)
- Philaccolus lepidus Guignot, 1949
- Philaccolus lineatoguttatus (Régimbart, 1894)
- Philaccolus ondoi Bilardo & Rocchi, 1990
- Philaccolus orthogrammus (Régimbart, 1895)
