= Laccoporus =

Scientific classification
- Kingdom: Animalia
- Phylum: Arthropoda
- Class: Insecta
- Order: Coleoptera
- Suborder: Adephaga
- Family: Dytiscidae
- Genus: Laccoporus; J.Balfour-Browne, 1939

Genus of beetles

Laccoporus is a genus of beetles in the family Dytiscidae, containing the following species:

- Laccoporus nigritulus (Gschwendtner, 1936)
- Laccoporus viator J.Balfour-Browne, 1939
