= Philodytes =

Philodytes umbrinus

Scientific classification
- Kingdom: Animalia
- Phylum: Arthropoda
- Class: Insecta
- Order: Coleoptera
- Suborder: Adephaga
- Family: Dytiscidae
- Genus: Philodytes; J.Balfour-Browne, 1939
- Species: P. umbrinus

Binomial name
- Philodytes umbrinus (Motschulsky, 1855)

Genus of beetles

Philodytes umbrinus is a species of beetle in the family Dytiscidae, the only species in the genus Philodytes.
