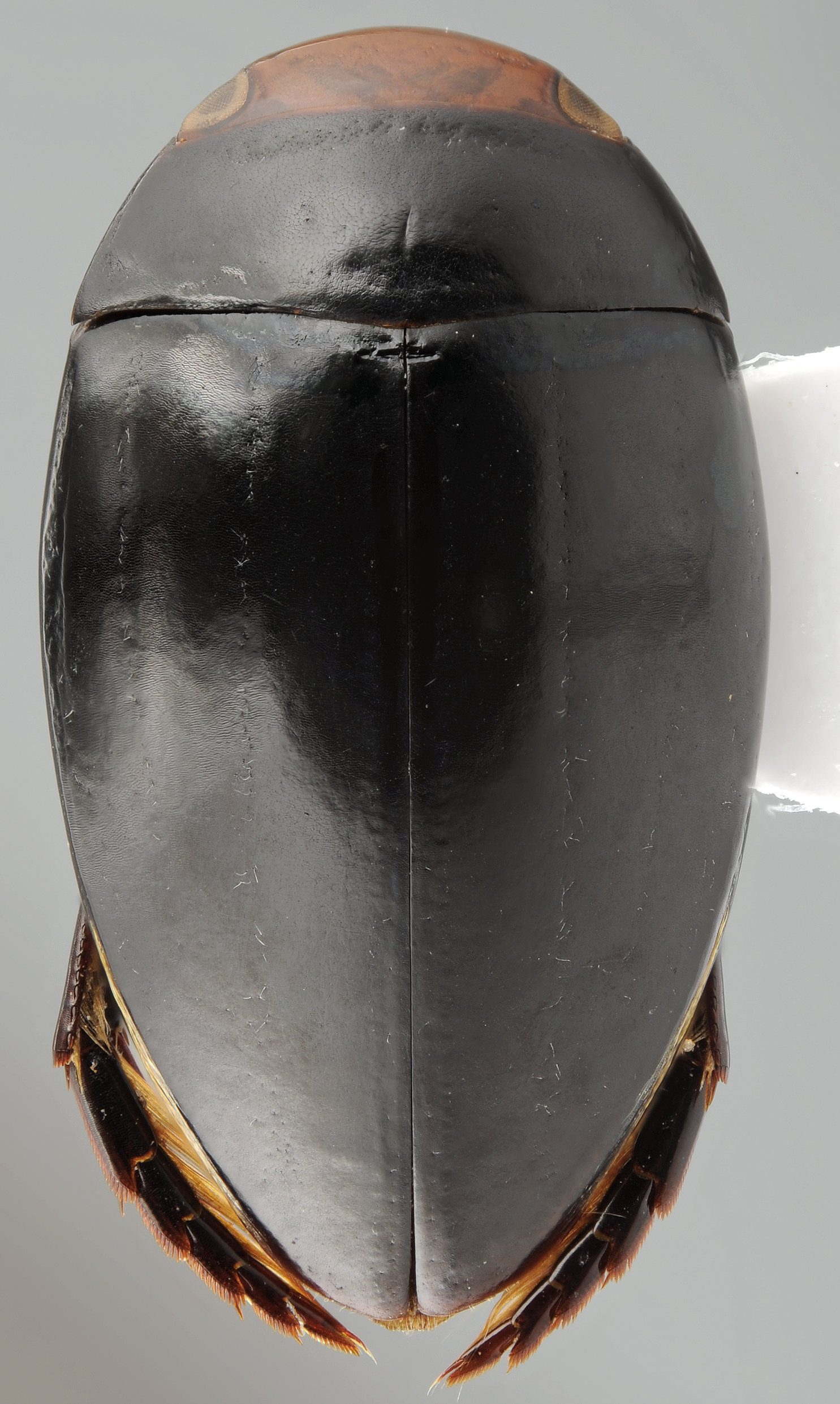
- Philaccolilus aterimus

Scientific classification
- Kingdom: Animalia
- Phylum: Arthropoda
- Class: Insecta
- Order: Coleoptera
- Suborder: Adephaga
- Family: Dytiscidae
- Genus: Philaccolilus; Guignot, 1937

= Philaccolilus =

Genus of beetles

Philaccolilus is a genus of beetles in the family Dytiscidae, containing the following species:

- Philaccolilus ameliae Balke, Larson, Hendrich & Konyorah, 2000
- Philaccolilus aterrimus Balke, Larson, Hendrich & Konyorah, 2000
- Philaccolilus bacchusi Balke, Larson, Hendrich & Konyorah, 2000
- Philaccolilus bellissimus Balke, Larson, Hendrich & Konyorah, 2000
- Philaccolilus bicinctus (Régimbart, 1892)
- Philaccolilus incognitus Balke, Larson, Hendrich & Konyorah, 2000
- Philaccolilus irianensis Balke, Larson, Hendrich & Konyorah, 2000
- Philaccolilus kokodanus Balke, Larson, Hendrich & Konyorah, 2000
- Philaccolilus mas Balke, Larson, Hendrich & Konyorah, 2000
- Philaccolilus mekus Balke, Larson, Hendrich & Konyorah, 2000
- Philaccolilus ramuensis Balke, Larson, Hendrich & Konyorah, 2000
- Philaccolilus speciosus (Régimbart, 1892)
