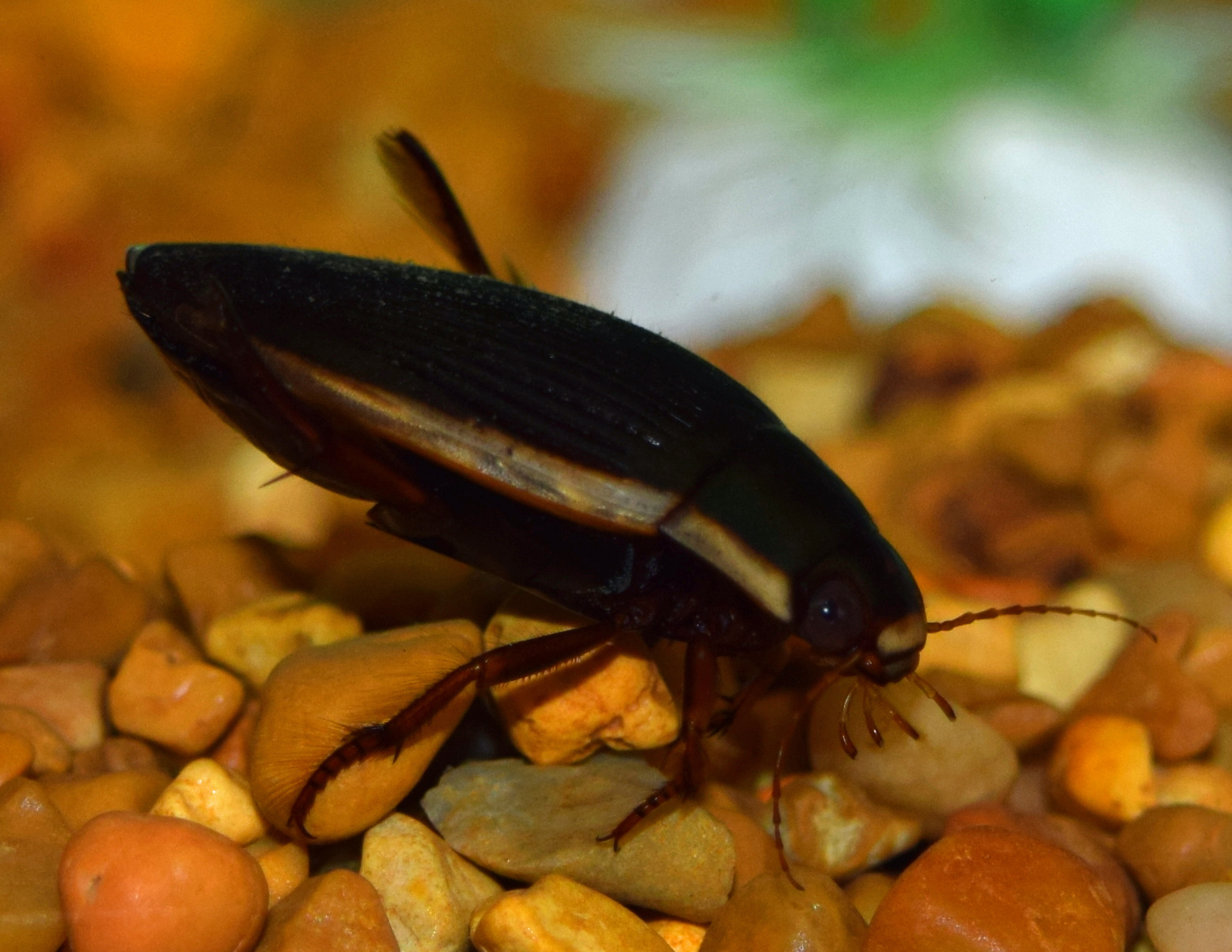
- Dytiscus carolinus

Scientific classification
- Domain: Eukaryota
- Kingdom: Animalia
- Phylum: Arthropoda
- Class: Insecta
- Order: Coleoptera
- Suborder: Adephaga
- Family: Dytiscidae
- Subfamily: Dytiscinae; Leach, 1815

= Dytiscinae =

Subfamily of beetles

Dytiscinae is a subfamily of predaceous diving beetles in the family Dytiscidae. There are at least 20 genera and 380 described species in Dytiscinae.

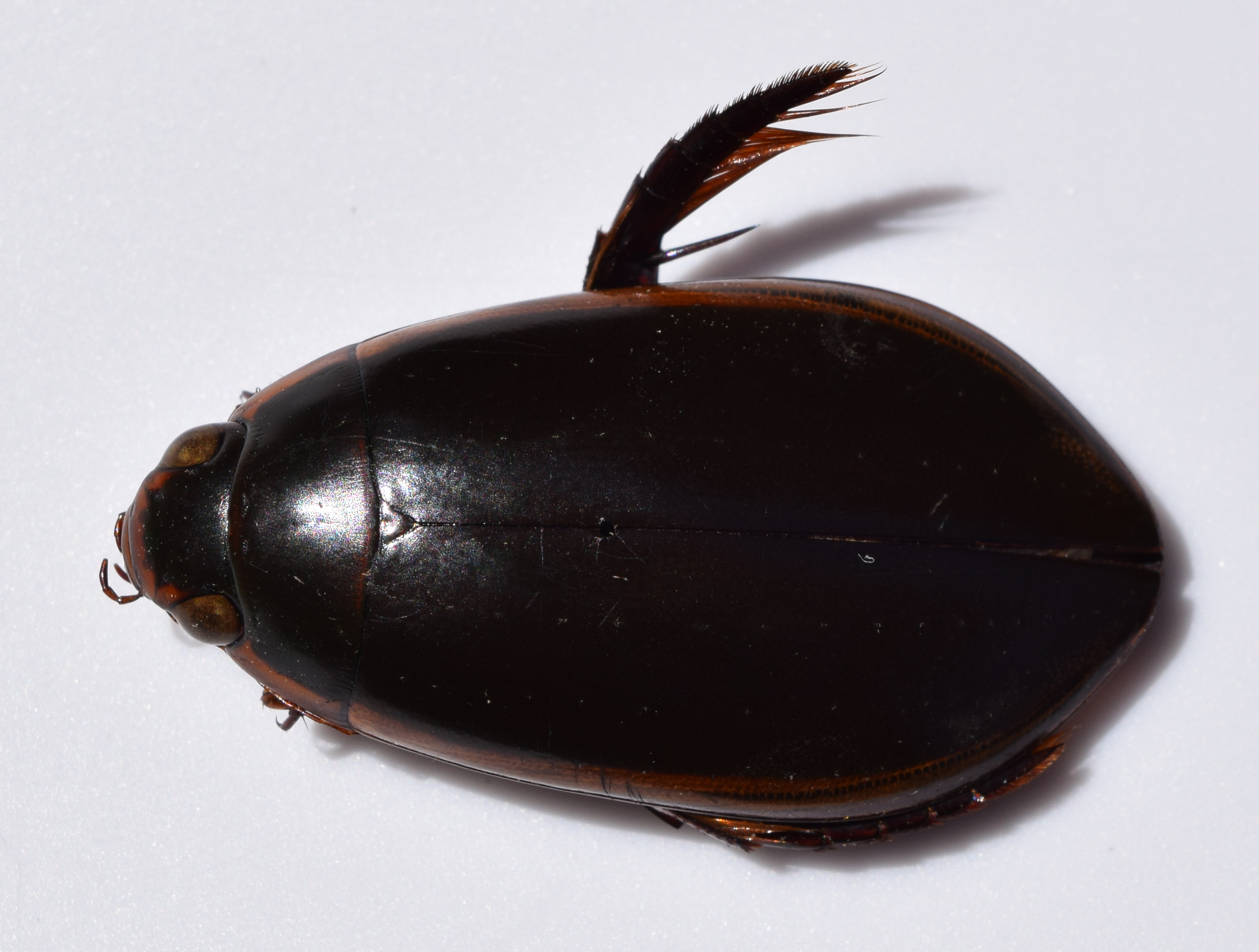
Cybister fimbriolatus

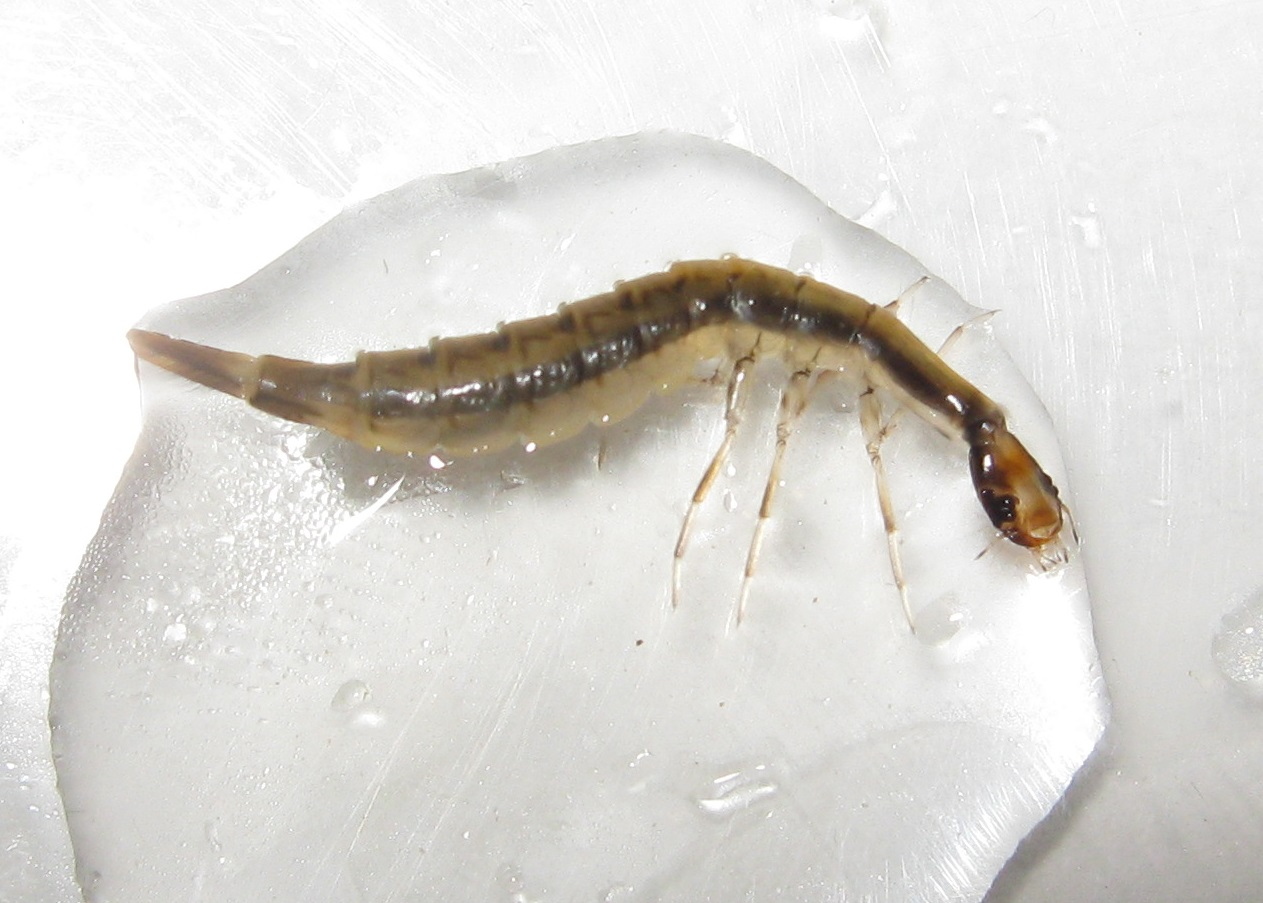
Larva of Aciliini

== Genera ==
- Acilius Leach, 1817
- Aethionectes Sharp, 1882
- Austrodytes Watts, 1978
- Cybister Curtis, 1827
- Dytiscus Linnaeus, 1758
- Eretes Laporte, 1833
- Graphoderus Dejean, 1833
- Hydaticus Leach, 1817
- Hyderodes Hope, 1838
- Megadytes Sharp, 1882
- Notaticus Zimmermann, 1928
- Onychohydrus Schaum and White, 1847
- Regimbartina Chatanay, 1911
- Rhantaticus Sharp, 1880
- Sandracottus Sharp, 1882
- Spencerhydrus Sharp, 1882
- Sternhydrus Brinck, 1945
- Thermonectus Dejean, 1833
- Tikoloshanes Omer-Cooper, 1956
