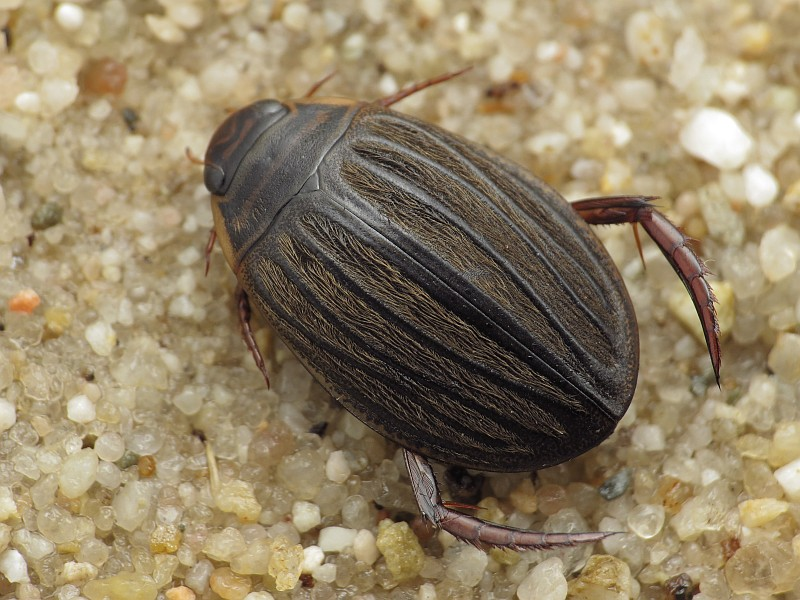
- Acilius canaliculatus

Scientific classification
- Domain: Eukaryota
- Kingdom: Animalia
- Phylum: Arthropoda
- Class: Insecta
- Order: Coleoptera
- Suborder: Adephaga
- Family: Dytiscidae
- Subfamily: Dytiscinae
- Tribe: Aciliini; Thomson, 1867

= Aciliini =

Tribe of beetles

Aciliini is a tribe of predaceous diving beetles in the family Dytiscidae. There are 7 genera and at least 69 described extant species in Aciliini, along with 5 fossil species.

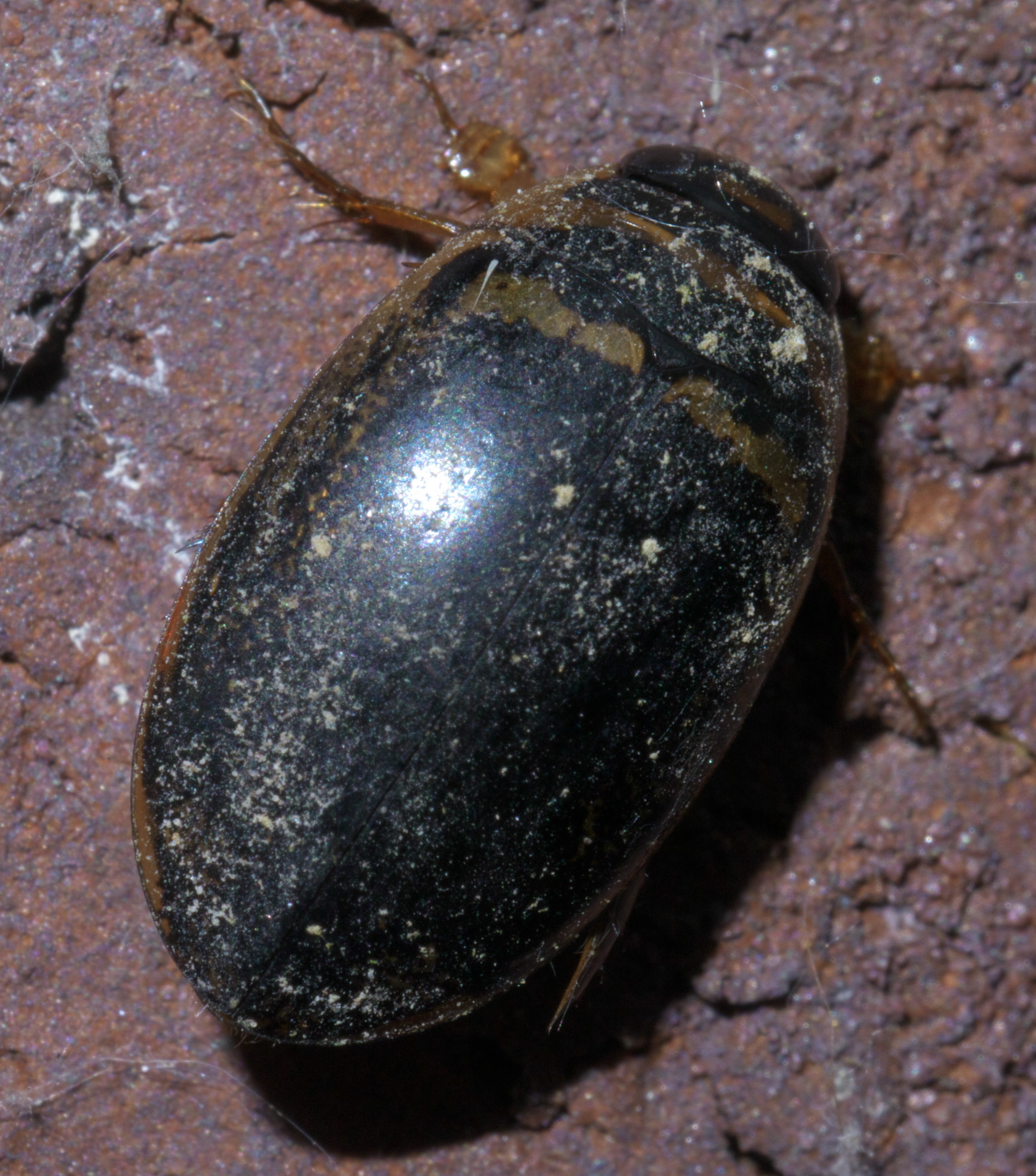
Thermonectus basillaris

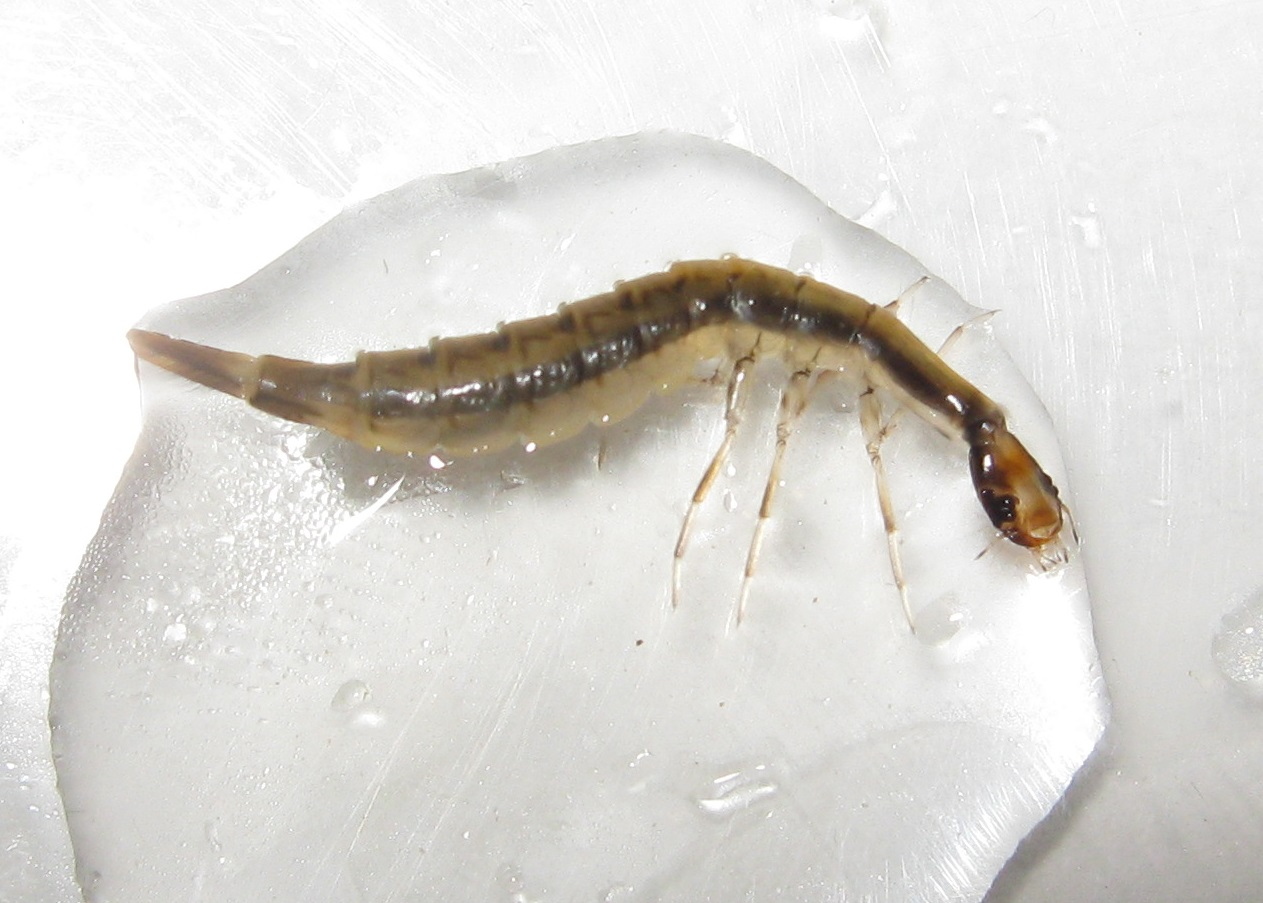
Larva of Aciliini

== Genera ==
These seven genera belong to the tribe Aciliini:

- Acilius Leach, 1817^{i c g b}
- Aethionectes Sharp, 1882^{i c g}
- Graphoderus Dejean, 1833^{i c g b}
- Rhantaticus Sharp, 1880^{i c g}
- Sandracottus Sharp, 1882^{i c g}
- Thermonectus Dejean, 1833^{i c g b}
- Tikoloshanes Omer-Cooper, 1956^{i c g}

Data sources: i = ITIS, c = Catalogue of Life, g = GBIF, b = Bugguide.net
