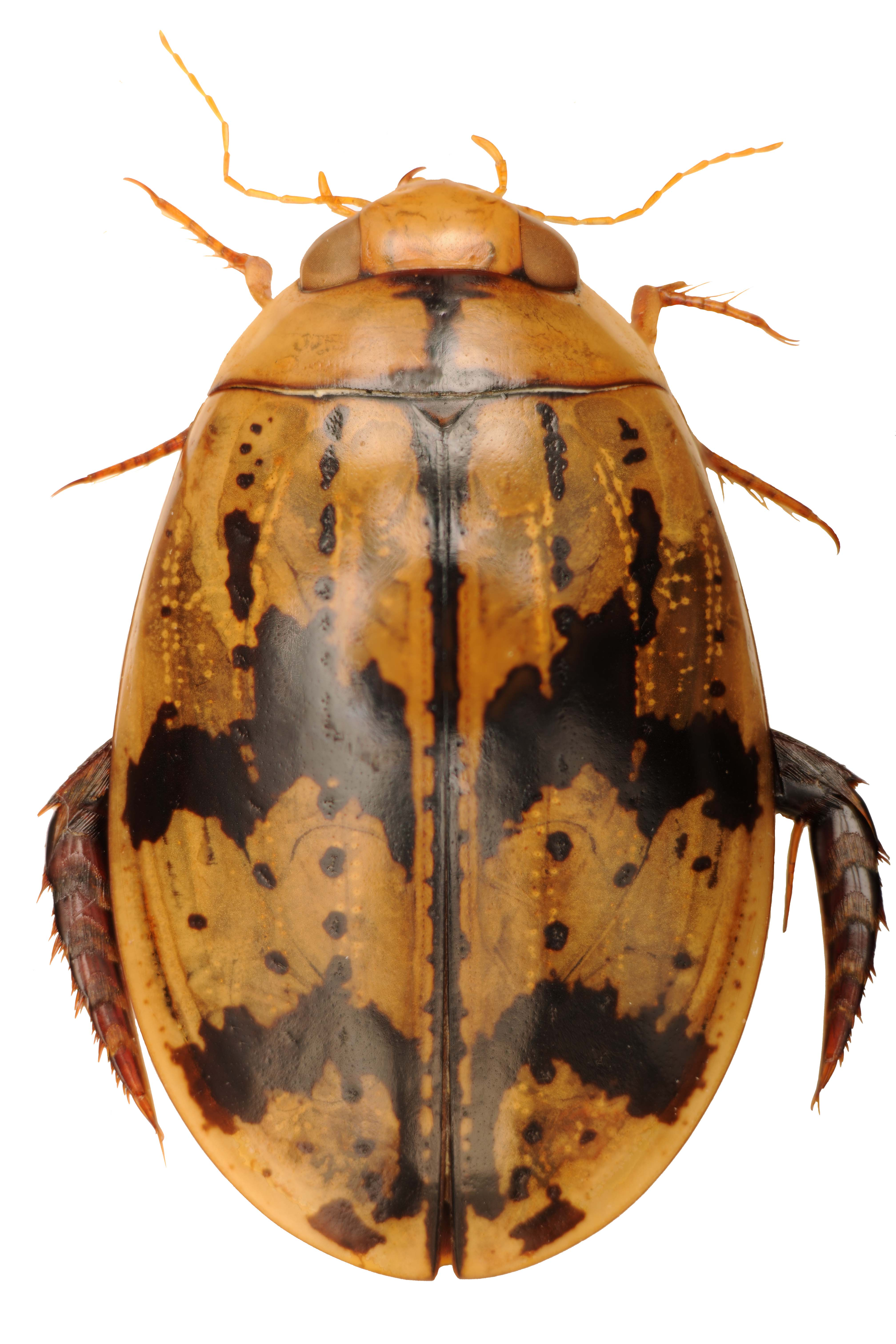

Scientific classification
- Domain: Eukaryota
- Kingdom: Animalia
- Phylum: Arthropoda
- Class: Insecta
- Order: Coleoptera
- Suborder: Adephaga
- Family: Dytiscidae
- Genus: Sandracottus
- Species: S. hunteri

Binomial name
- Sandracottus hunteri (Crotch, 1872)

Synonyms
- Sandracottus fasciatus Sandracottus manipurensis

= Sandracottus hunteri =

Species of beetles

Sandracottus hunteri is a species of beetle in the family Dytiscidae that occurs in Asia from southern Japan east to India and south to Java.
