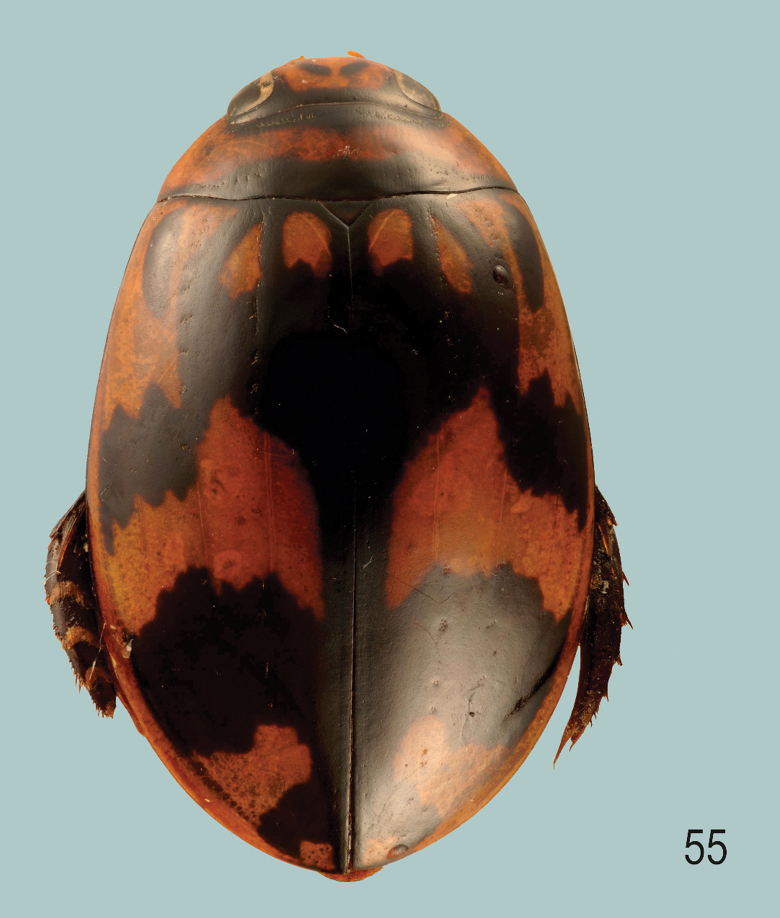

Scientific classification
- Kingdom: Animalia
- Phylum: Arthropoda
- Class: Insecta
- Order: Coleoptera
- Suborder: Adephaga
- Family: Dytiscidae
- Genus: Sandracottus
- Species: S. insignis

Binomial name
- Sandracottus insignis (Wehncke, 1876)

Synonyms
- Sandracottus baeri Sandracottus insignus ornatus

= Sandracottus insignis =

Species of beetles

Sandracottus insignis is a species of beetle in the family Dytiscidae that occurs in the Philippines and possibly Malaysia.
