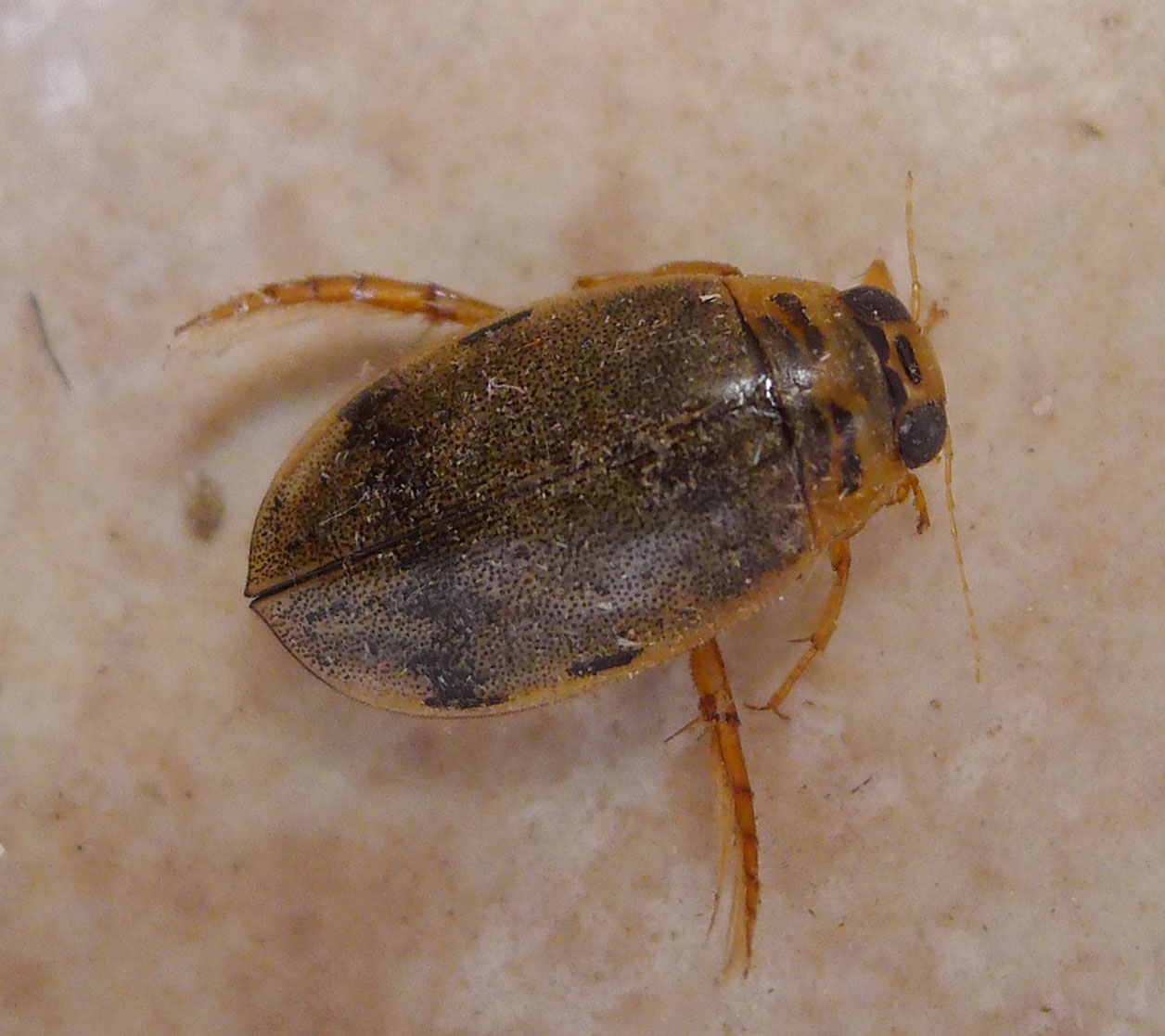

Scientific classification
- Kingdom: Animalia
- Phylum: Arthropoda
- Class: Insecta
- Order: Coleoptera
- Suborder: Adephaga
- Family: Dytiscidae
- Genus: Eretes
- Species: E. sticticus

Binomial name
- Eretes sticticus (Linnaeus, 1767)

Synonyms
- Eretes occidentalis (Erichson, 1847)

= Eretes sticticus =

Species of beetle

Eretes sticticus, the western erete, is a species of predaceous diving beetle in the family Dytiscidae. It is found in Africa, the Middle East, and the Americas from the southern United States to Peru. This species preys specifically on mosquito larvae in ponds and pools. They can kill up to all the instar larvae of the mosquito depending on size and density of the prey.

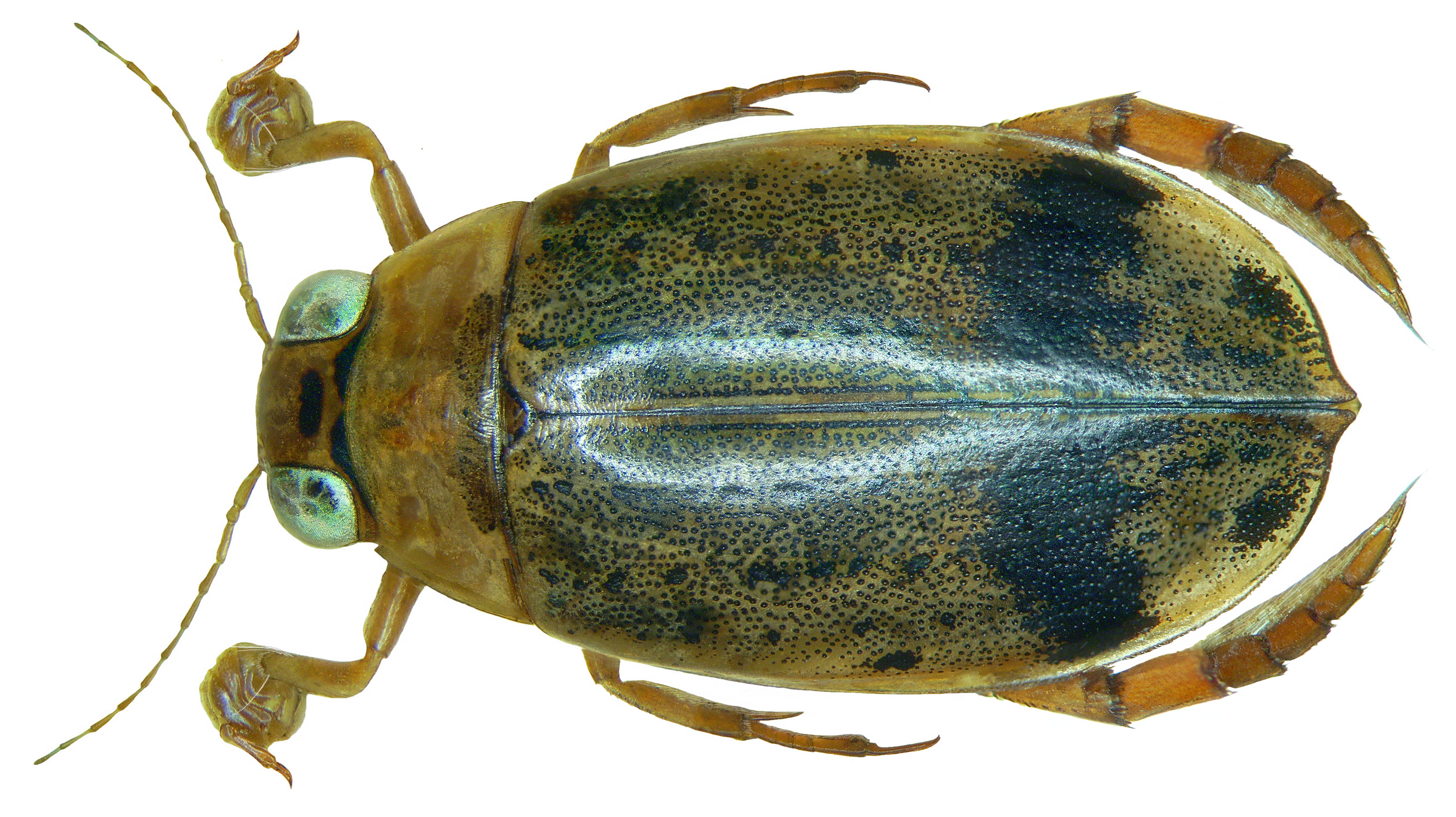

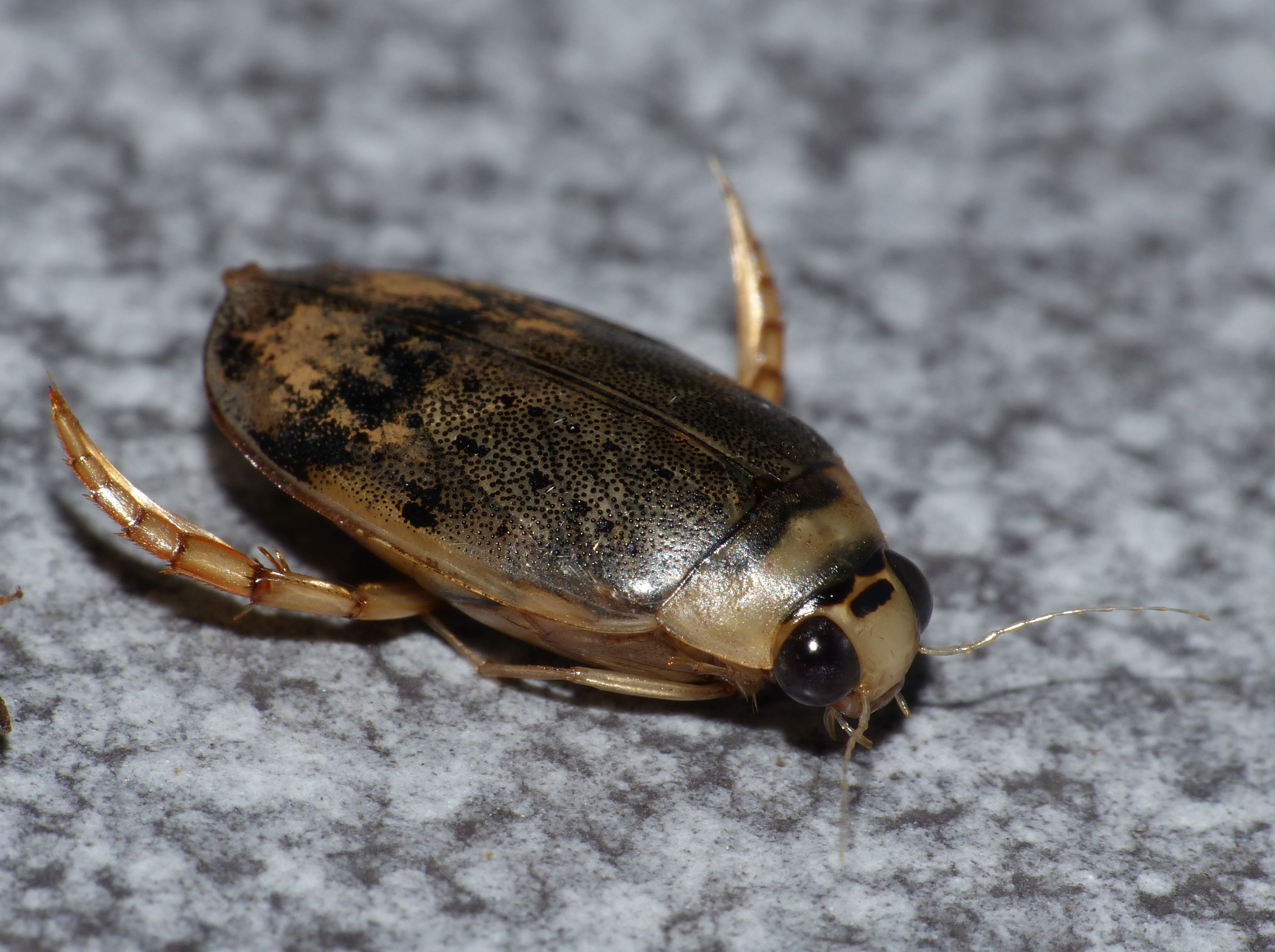
