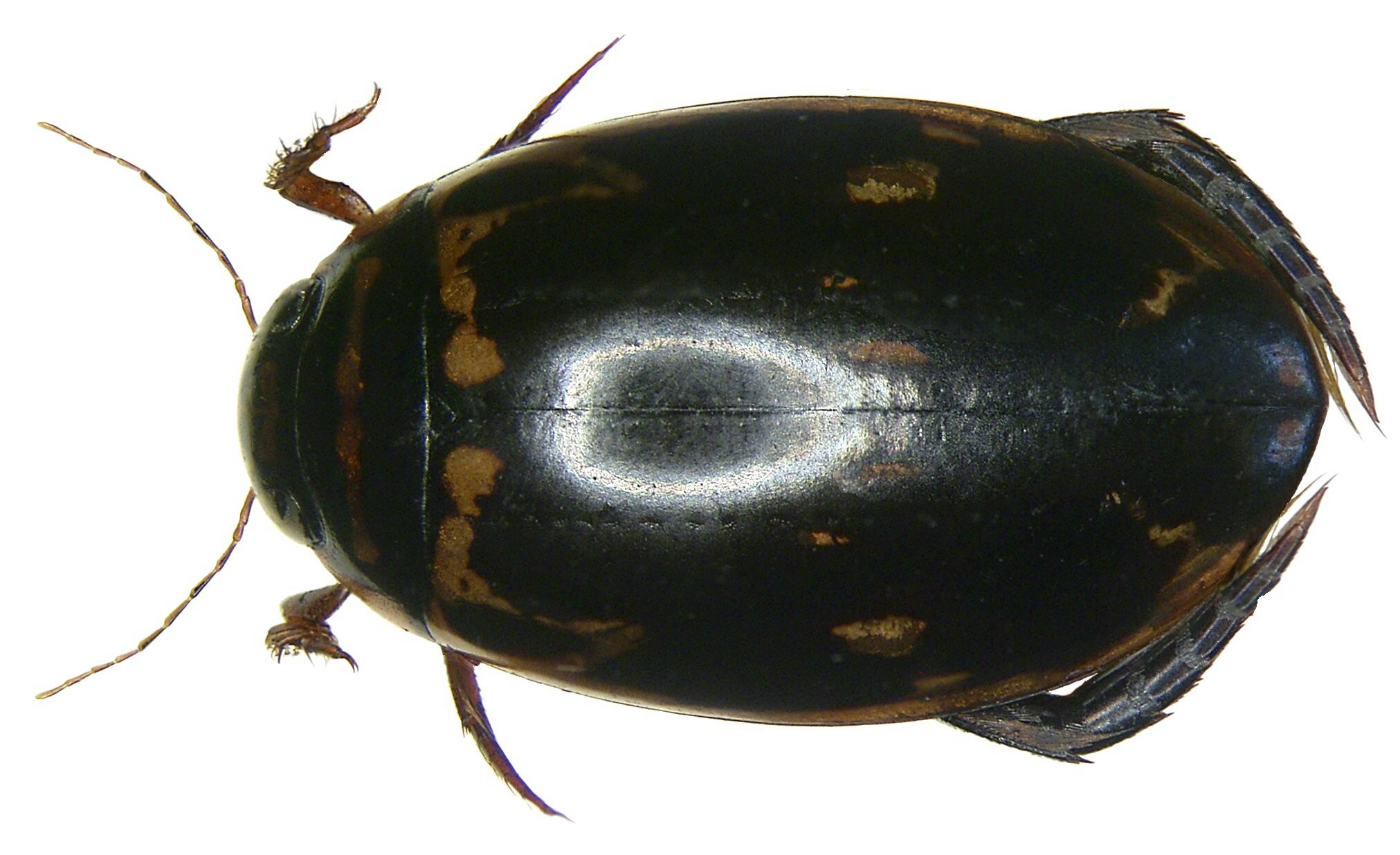
- Sandracottus femoralis

Scientific classification
- Kingdom: Animalia
- Phylum: Arthropoda
- Class: Insecta
- Order: Coleoptera
- Suborder: Adephaga
- Family: Dytiscidae
- Subfamily: Dytiscinae
- Tribe: Aciliini
- Genus: Sandracottus; Sharp, 1882

= Sandracottus (beetle) =

Genus of beetles

Sandracottus is a genus of beetles in the family Dytiscidae containing eleven species. These aquatic beetles are found in ponds and slow streams from South Asia east to southern Japan, and south to Australia. They are generally about 1–1.5 cm (0.4–0.6 in) long and often have distinctive markings.

== Species ==
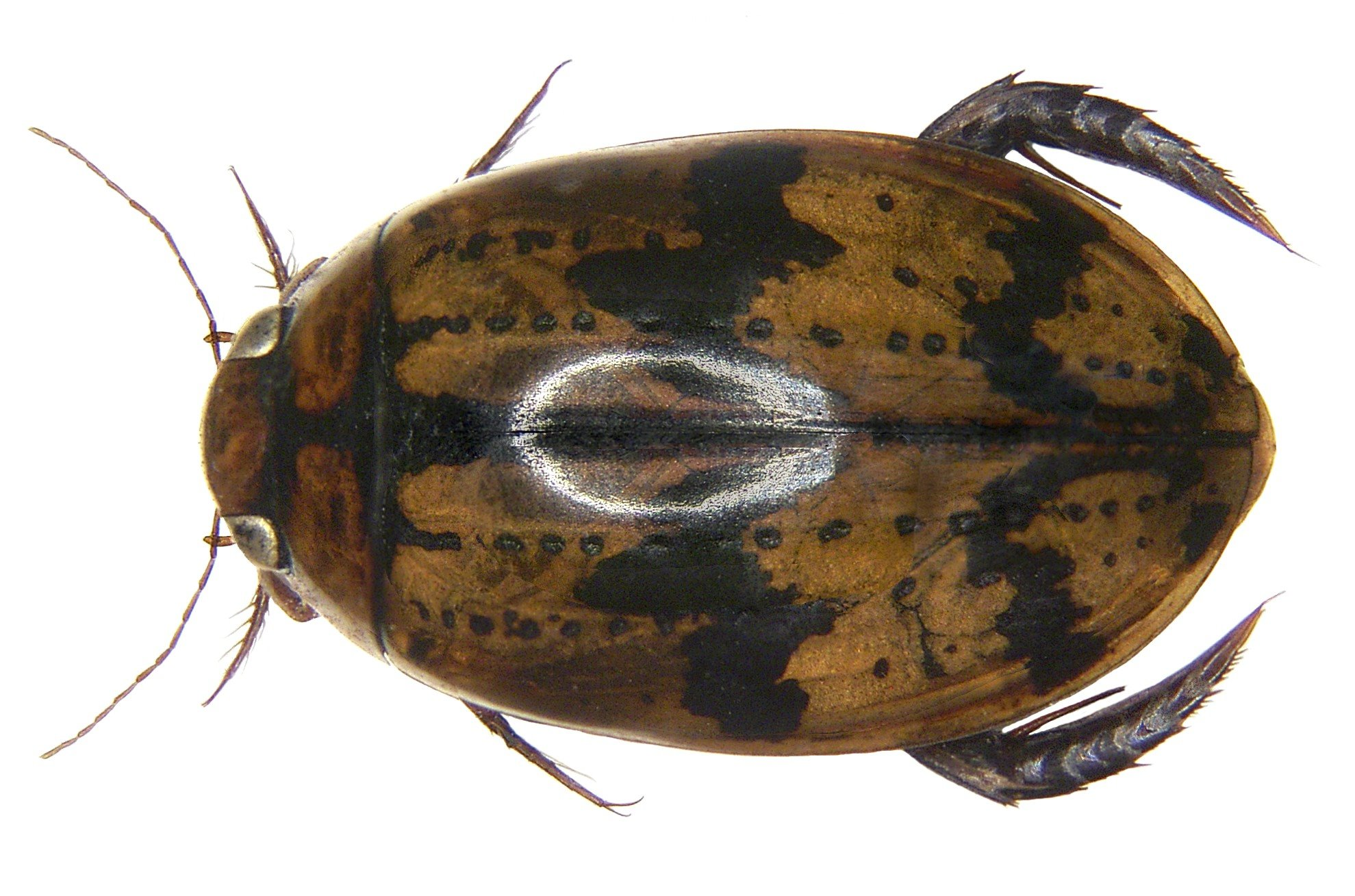
Sandracottus chevrolati

The genus contains the following 11 accepted species and one subspecies:

- Sandracottus bakewellii (Clark, 1864)
  - Sandracottus bakewellii guttatus (Sharp, 1882)
- Sandracottus bizonatus (Régimbart, 1899)
- Sandracottus chevrolati (Aubé, 1838)
- Sandracottus dejeanii (Aubé, 1838)
- Sandracottus femoralis (Heller, 1934)
- Sandracottus festivus (Illiger, 1802)
- Sandracottus hunteri (Crotch, 1872)
- Sandracottus insignis (Wehncke, 1876)
- Sandracottus jaechi (Wewalka & Vazirani, 1985)
- Sandracottus maculatus (Wehncke, 1876)
- Sandracottus rotundus (Sharp, 1882)
