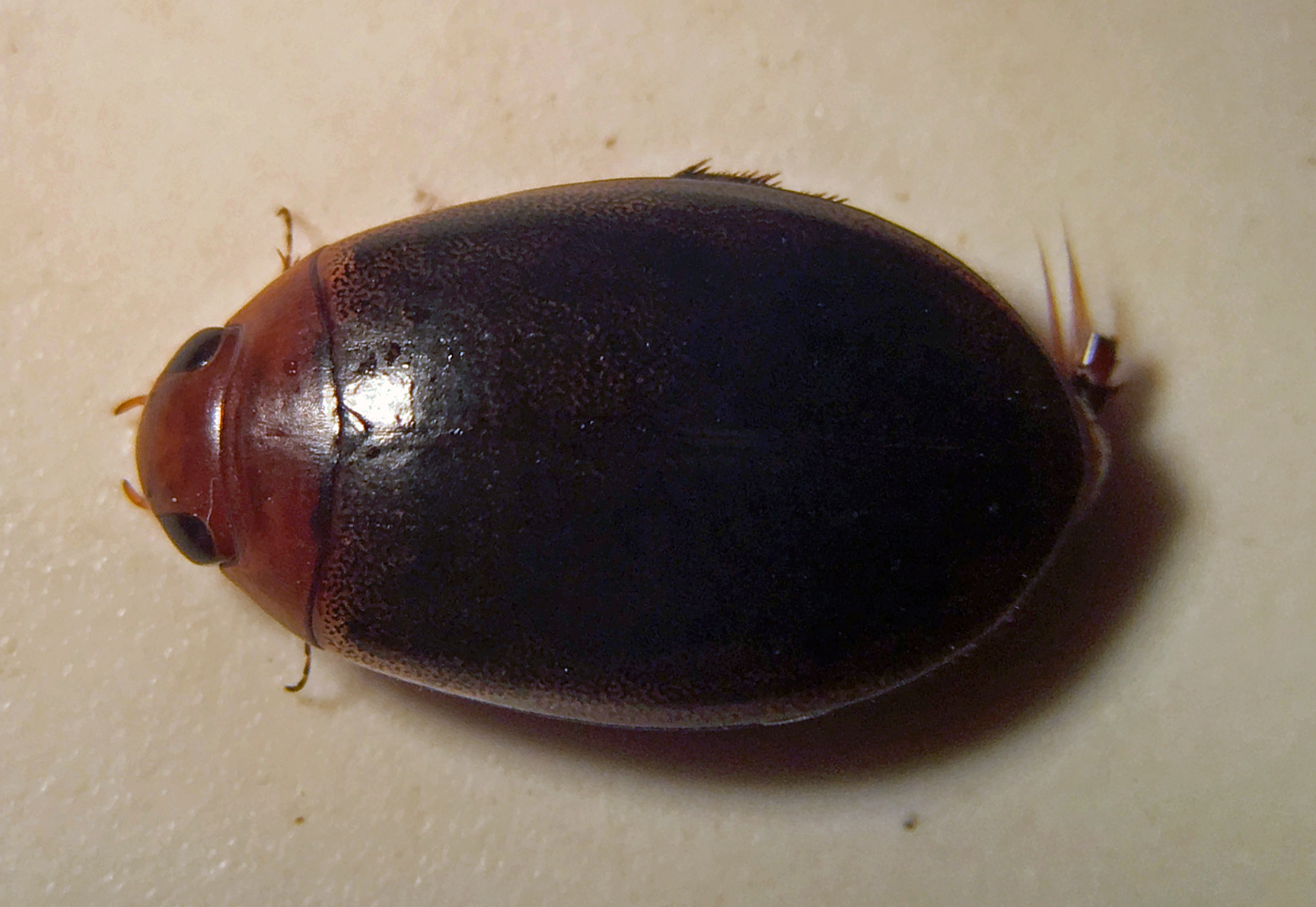

Scientific classification
- Kingdom: Animalia
- Phylum: Arthropoda
- Clade: Pancrustacea
- Class: Insecta
- Order: Coleoptera
- Suborder: Adephaga
- Family: Dytiscidae
- Genus: Graphoderus
- Species: G. liberus

Binomial name
- Graphoderus liberus (Say, 1825)

= Graphoderus liberus =

Species of beetle

Graphoderus liberus is a species of predaceous diving beetle in the family Dytiscidae. It is found in North America.
