= Thermonectus sibleyi =

Scientific classification
- Domain: Eukaryota
- Kingdom: Animalia
- Phylum: Arthropoda
- Class: Insecta
- Order: Coleoptera
- Suborder: Adephaga
- Family: Dytiscidae
- Genus: Thermonectus
- Species: T. sibleyi

Binomial name
- Thermonectus sibleyi Goodhue-McWilliams, 1981

Species of beetle

Thermonectus sibleyi is a species of diving beetle native to western Mexico and southern Arizona, United States. T. sibleyi reaches a total length of 11.4 to 13.8 millimetres (0.45 to 0.54 in) and has an overall light, speckled color pattern.
