= Thermonectus zimmermani =

Scientific classification
- Domain: Eukaryota
- Kingdom: Animalia
- Phylum: Arthropoda
- Class: Insecta
- Order: Coleoptera
- Suborder: Adephaga
- Family: Dytiscidae
- Genus: Thermonectus
- Species: T. zimmermani

Binomial name
- Thermonectus zimmermani Goodhue-McWilliams, 1981

Species of beetle

Thermonectus zimmermani is a species of diving beetle native to western Mexican states of Jalisco, Colima, and Morelos. T. zimmermani reaches a total length of 9.5 to 11.3 millimetres (0.37 to 0.44 in) and has variable bright yellow and black markings similar to that of T. marmoratus. However, T. marmoratus has a spotted pattern of yellow circles, T. zimmermani has an irregular, blotched pattern. T. zimmermani head has a V-shaped medial black marking that has been reduced.
