= Graphoderus fascicollis =

Scientific classification
- Domain: Eukaryota
- Kingdom: Animalia
- Phylum: Arthropoda
- Class: Insecta
- Order: Coleoptera
- Suborder: Adephaga
- Family: Dytiscidae
- Genus: Graphoderus
- Species: G. fascicollis

Binomial name
- Graphoderus fascicollis (Harris, 1828)

Species of beetle

Graphoderus fascicollis is a species of predaceous diving beetle in the family Dytiscidae. It is found in North America.
