= Graphoderus perplexus =

Scientific classification
- Kingdom: Animalia
- Phylum: Arthropoda
- Class: Insecta
- Order: Coleoptera
- Suborder: Adephaga
- Family: Dytiscidae
- Genus: Graphoderus
- Species: G. perplexus

Binomial name
- Graphoderus perplexus Sharp, 1882

Species of beetle

Graphoderus perplexus, the predacious diving beetle, is a species of predaceous diving beetle in the family Dytiscidae. It is found in North America and the Palearctic.
