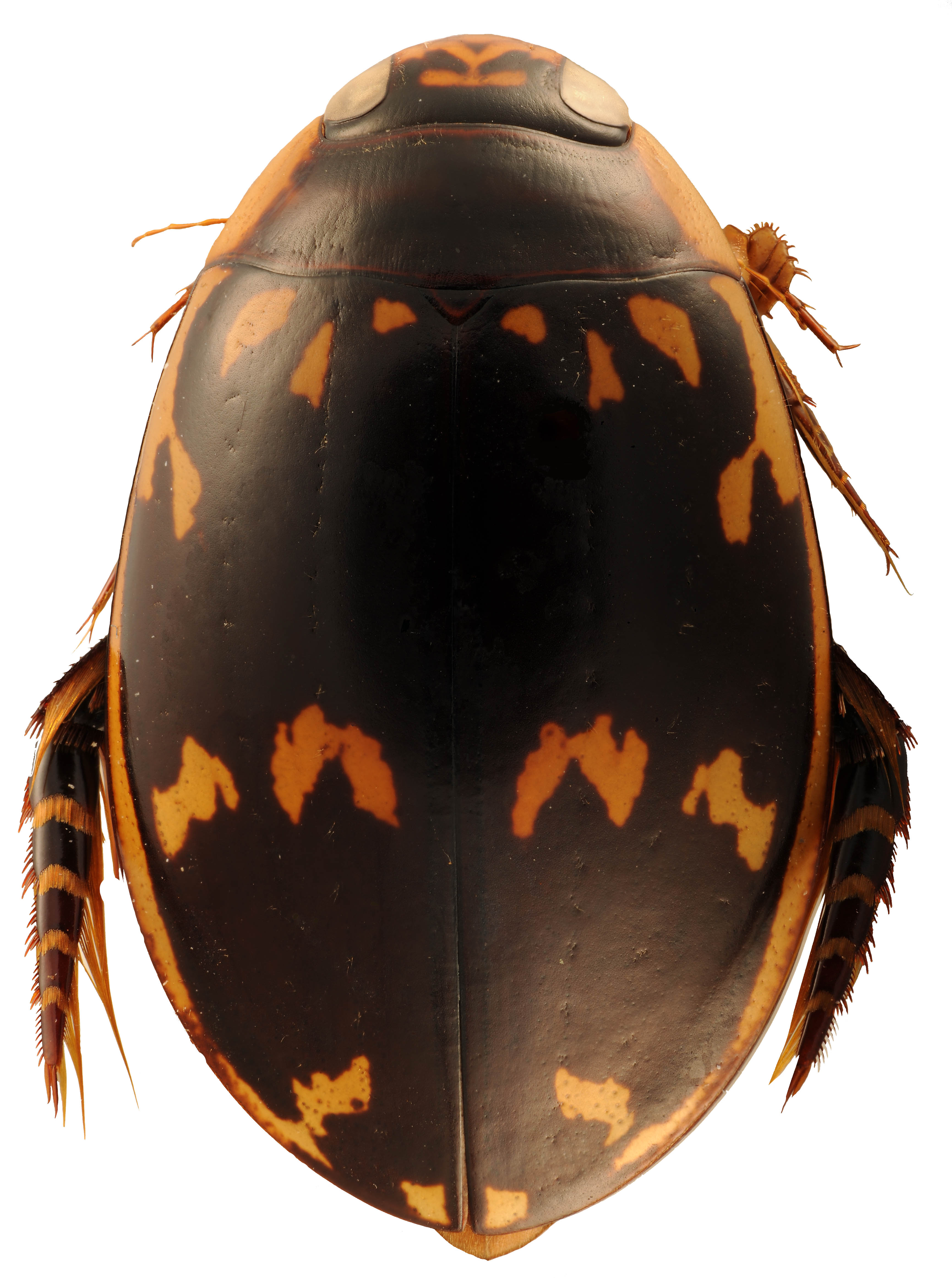

Scientific classification
- Domain: Eukaryota
- Kingdom: Animalia
- Phylum: Arthropoda
- Class: Insecta
- Order: Coleoptera
- Suborder: Adephaga
- Family: Dytiscidae
- Genus: Sandracottus
- Species: S. maculatus

Binomial name
- Sandracottus maculatus (Wehncke, 1876)

Synonyms
- Sandracottus wehnckei Sandracottus angulifer Sandracottus palawanensis Sandracottus nauticus

= Sandracottus maculatus =

Species of beetles

Sandracottus maculatus is a species of beetle in the family Dytiscidae that occurs in Southeast Asia, from Northern Vietnam south to Java and east to the Philippines.
