= Thermonectus intermedius =

Scientific classification
- Domain: Eukaryota
- Kingdom: Animalia
- Phylum: Arthropoda
- Class: Insecta
- Order: Coleoptera
- Suborder: Adephaga
- Family: Dytiscidae
- Genus: Thermonectus
- Species: T. intermedius

Binomial name
- Thermonectus intermedius Crotch, 1873

Species of beetle

Thermonectus intermedius is a species of predaceous diving beetle in the family Dytiscidae. It is found in North America.
