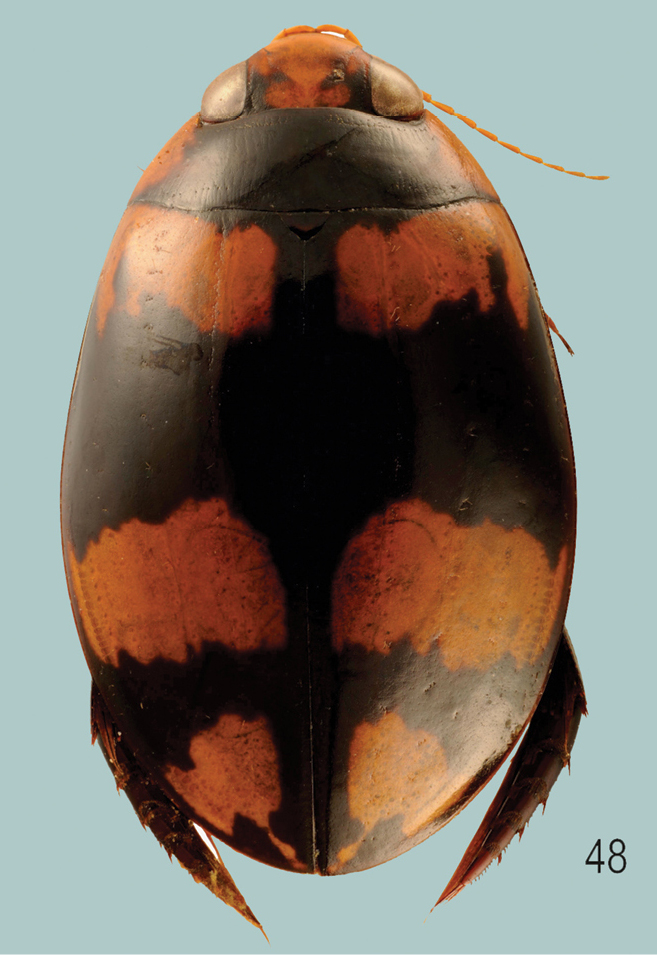

Scientific classification
- Kingdom: Animalia
- Phylum: Arthropoda
- Class: Insecta
- Order: Coleoptera
- Suborder: Adephaga
- Family: Dytiscidae
- Genus: Sandracottus
- Species: S. bizonatus

Binomial name
- Sandracottus bizonatus Régimbart, 1899

= Sandracottus bizonatus =

Species of beetles

Sandracottus bizonatus is a species of beetle in the family Dytiscidae that occurs on the island of Borneo.
