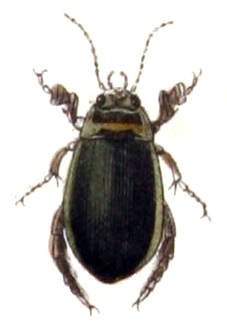

Scientific classification
- Domain: Eukaryota
- Kingdom: Animalia
- Phylum: Arthropoda
- Class: Insecta
- Order: Coleoptera
- Suborder: Adephaga
- Family: Dytiscidae
- Genus: Graphoderus
- Species: G. zonatus

Binomial name
- Graphoderus zonatus (Hoppe, 1795)

= Graphoderus zonatus =

Species of beetle

Graphoderus zonatus is a species of beetle in family Dytiscidae. It is found in Austria, Belarus, Belgium, England, Bulgaria, Croatia, the Czech Republic, mainland Denmark, Estonia, Finland, mainland France, Germany, Hungary, mainland Italy, Kaliningrad, Latvia, Lithuania, Luxembourg, Moldova, mainland Norway, Poland, Russia, Slovakia, Slovenia, Sweden, Switzerland, the Netherlands, Ukraine, and Yugoslavia.
