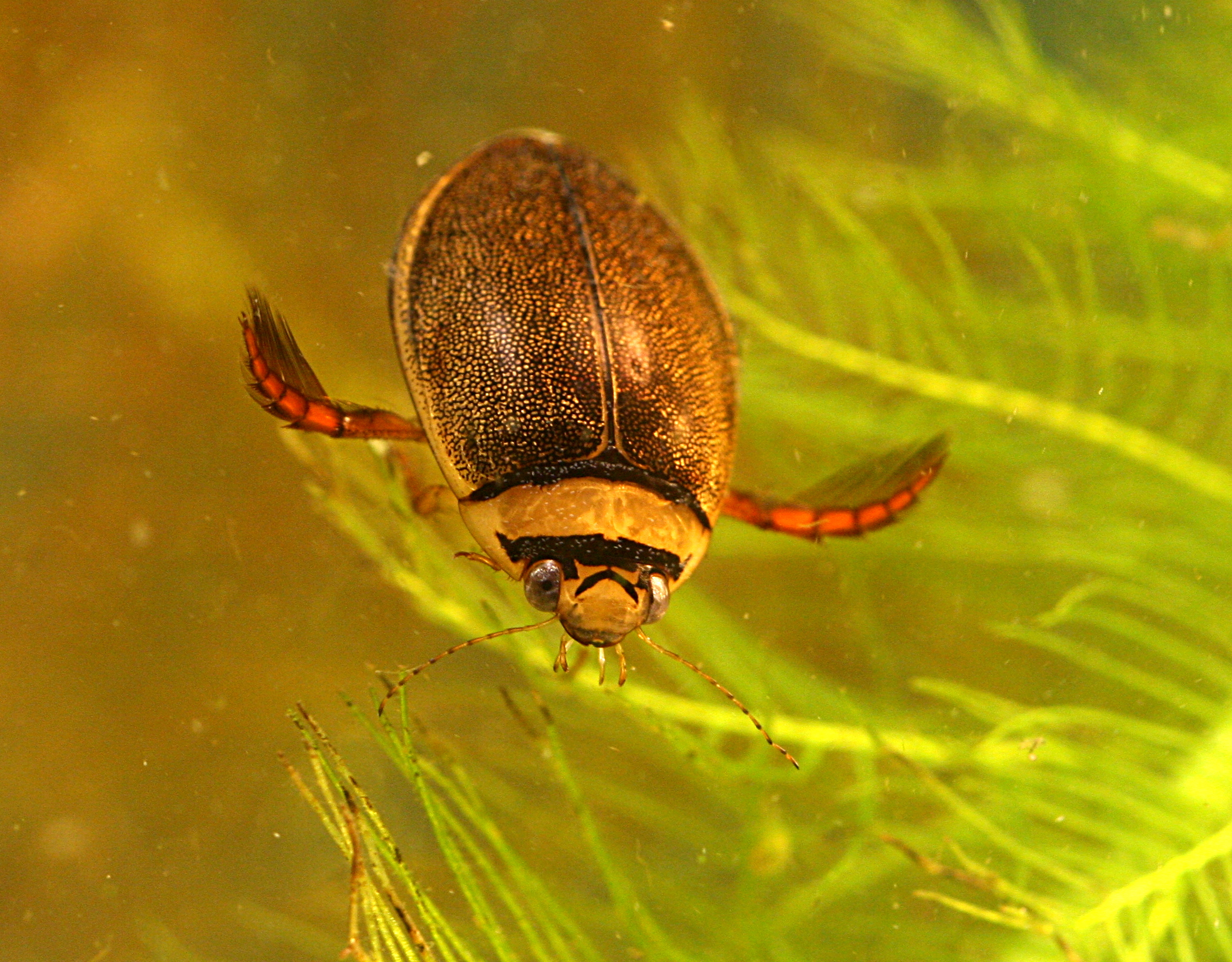

Conservation status
- Vulnerable (IUCN 2.3)

Scientific classification
- Kingdom: Animalia
- Phylum: Arthropoda
- Class: Insecta
- Order: Coleoptera
- Suborder: Adephaga
- Family: Dytiscidae
- Genus: Graphoderus
- Species: G. bilineatus

Binomial name
- Graphoderus bilineatus (De Geer, 1774)

Synonyms
- Dytiscus bilineatus De Geer, 1774

= Graphoderus bilineatus =

Species of beetle

Graphoderus bilineatus is a species of beetle in family Dytiscidae. The IUCN Red List reports it from Austria, Belgium, Bosnia and Herzegovina, Croatia, the Czech Republic, Denmark, Finland, France, Germany, Hungary, Italy, Latvia, Lithuania, Luxembourg, the Netherlands, Norway, Poland, Russia, Serbia and Montenegro, Slovakia, Switzerland, Turkmenistan, Ukraine, and the United Kingdom.
