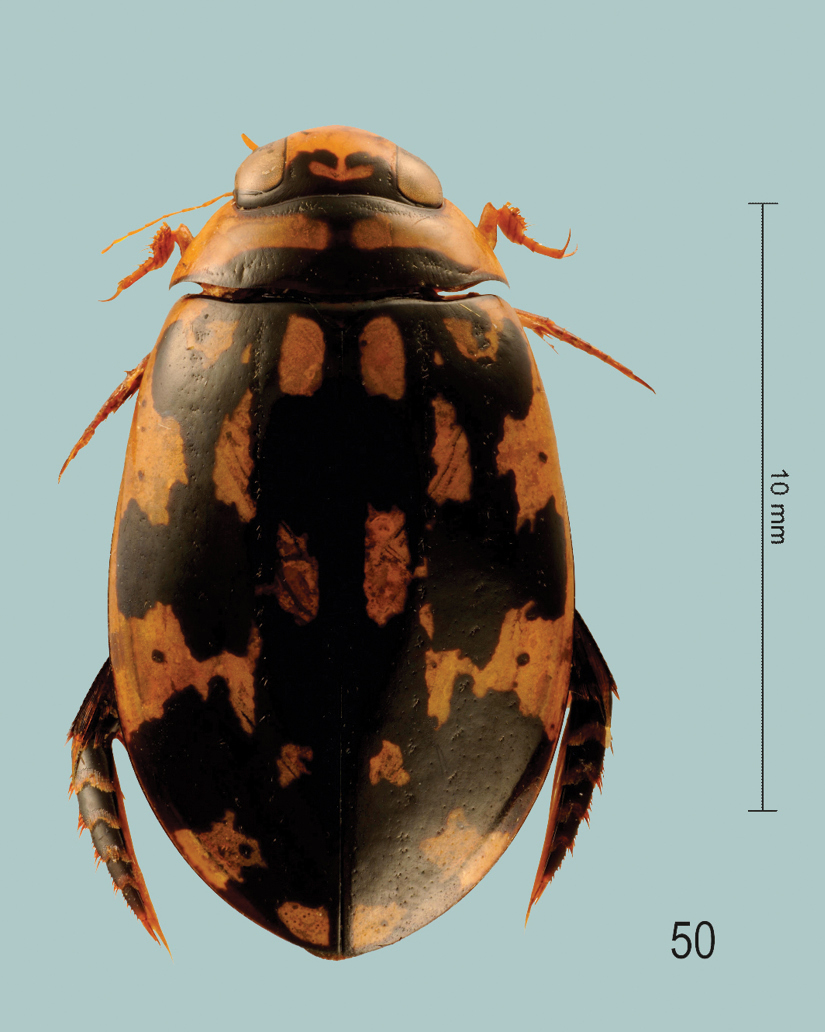

Scientific classification
- Domain: Eukaryota
- Kingdom: Animalia
- Phylum: Arthropoda
- Class: Insecta
- Order: Coleoptera
- Suborder: Adephaga
- Family: Dytiscidae
- Genus: Sandracottus
- Species: S. dejeanii

Binomial name
- Sandracottus dejeanii Aubé, 1838

Synonyms
- Sandracottus vijayakumari

= Sandracottus dejeanii =

Species of beetles

Sandracottus dejeanii is a species of beetle in the family Dytiscidae that occurs in India, Nepal, Pakistan, Myanmar, and eastern Iran.
