= Eretes explicitus =

Scientific classification
- Domain: Eukaryota
- Kingdom: Animalia
- Phylum: Arthropoda
- Class: Insecta
- Order: Coleoptera
- Suborder: Adephaga
- Family: Dytiscidae
- Genus: Eretes
- Species: E. explicitus

Binomial name
- Eretes explicitus K. B. Miller, 2002

Species of beetle

Eretes explicitus is a species of predaceous diving beetle in the family Dytiscidae. It is found in North America.
