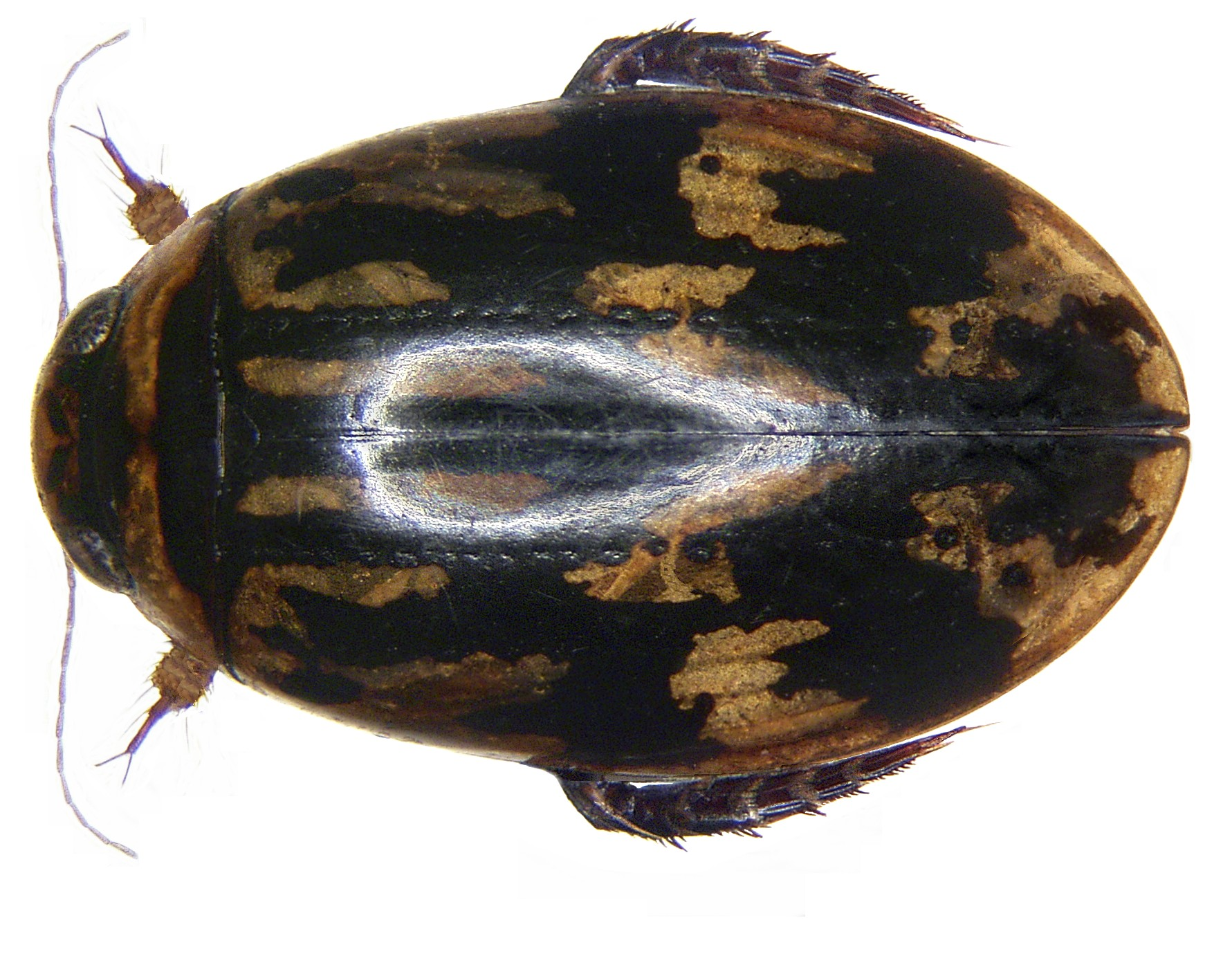

Scientific classification
- Kingdom: Animalia
- Phylum: Arthropoda
- Class: Insecta
- Order: Coleoptera
- Suborder: Adephaga
- Family: Dytiscidae
- Genus: Sandracottus
- Species: S. festivus

Binomial name
- Sandracottus festivus (Illiger, 1802)

= Sandracottus festivus =

Species of beetles

Sandracottus festivus is a species of beetle in the family Dytiscidae. It occurs on the Indian subcontinent from northern Pakistan to eastern India and south to Sri Lanka.
