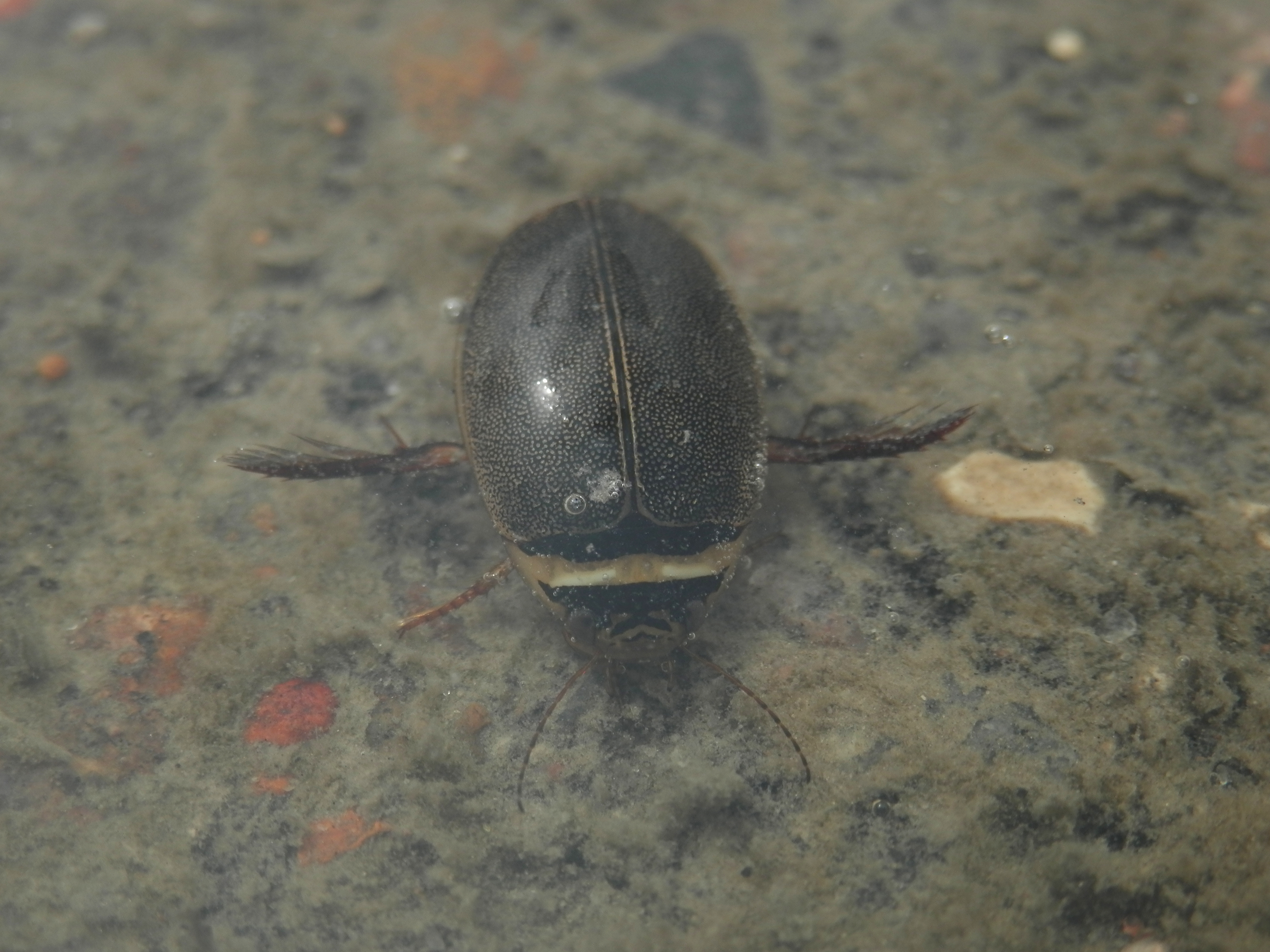

Scientific classification
- Domain: Eukaryota
- Kingdom: Animalia
- Phylum: Arthropoda
- Class: Insecta
- Order: Coleoptera
- Suborder: Adephaga
- Family: Dytiscidae
- Genus: Graphoderus
- Species: G. occidentalis

Binomial name
- Graphoderus occidentalis Horn, 1883

= Graphoderus occidentalis =

Species of beetle

Graphoderus occidentalis is a species of predaceous diving beetle in the family Dytiscidae. It is found in North America.
