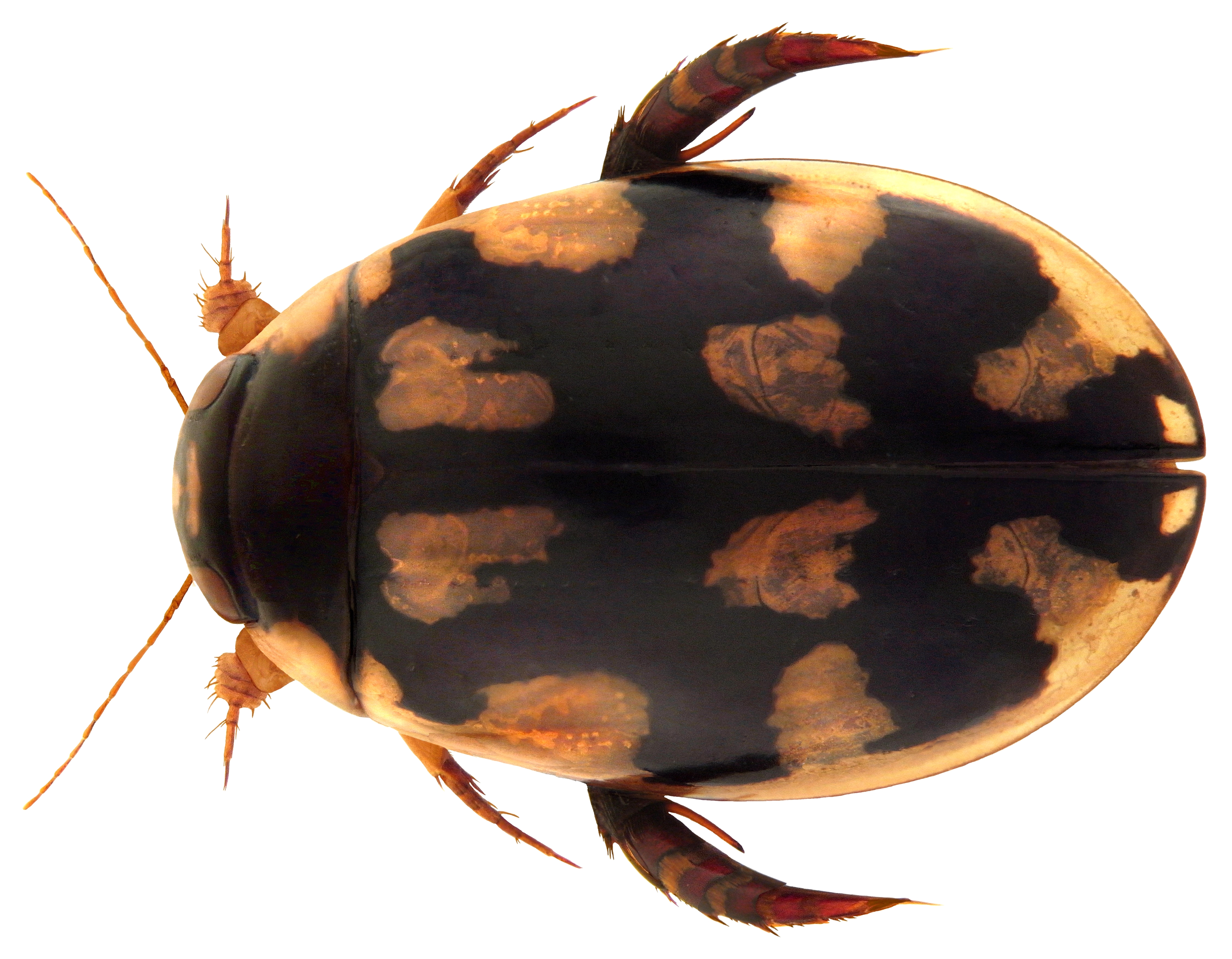

Scientific classification
- Kingdom: Animalia
- Phylum: Arthropoda
- Class: Insecta
- Order: Coleoptera
- Suborder: Adephaga
- Family: Dytiscidae
- Genus: Sandracottus
- Species: S. rotundus

Binomial name
- Sandracottus rotundus Sharp, 1882

= Sandracottus rotundus =

Species of beetles

Sandracottus rotundus is a species of beetle in the family Dytiscidae that occurs on the island of Sulawesi.
