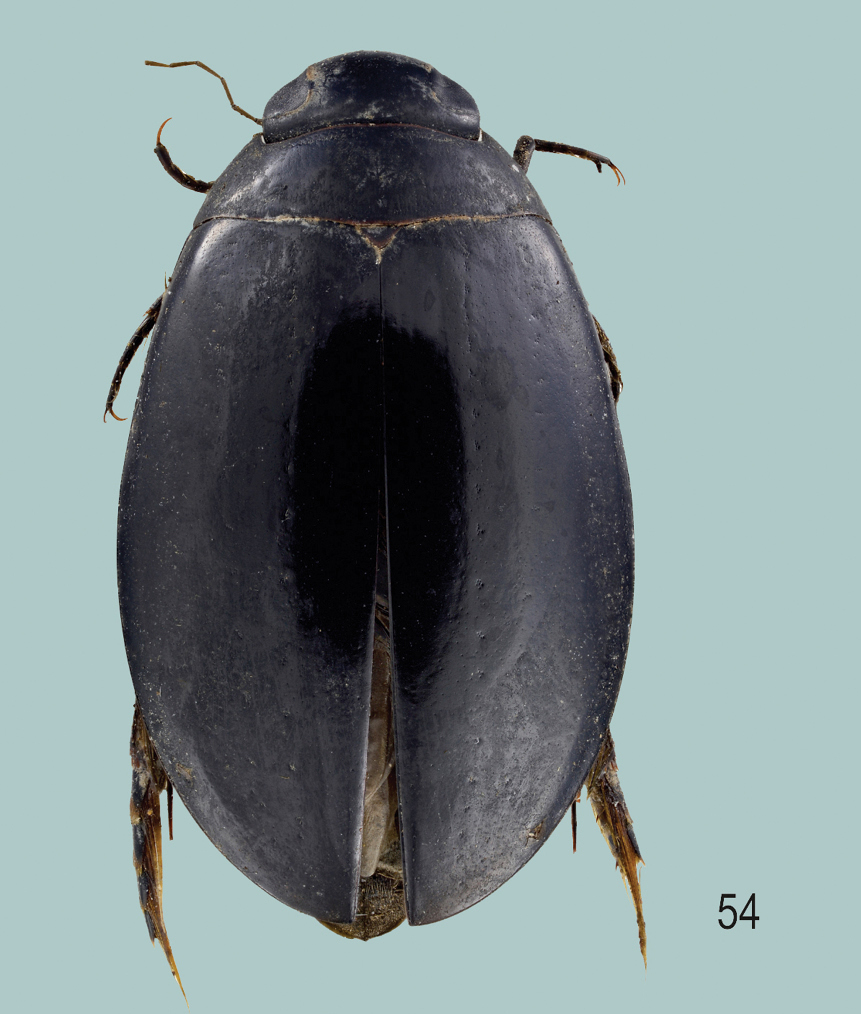

Scientific classification
- Kingdom: Animalia
- Phylum: Arthropoda
- Class: Insecta
- Order: Coleoptera
- Suborder: Adephaga
- Family: Dytiscidae
- Genus: Sandracottus
- Species: S. jaechi

Binomial name
- Sandracottus jaechi Wewalka & Vazirani, 1985

= Sandracottus jaechi =

Species of beetle

Sandracottus jaechi is a species of predaceous diving beetle found in Sri Lanka.

== Description ==
Total body length is about 14.4 to 15.0 mm.
