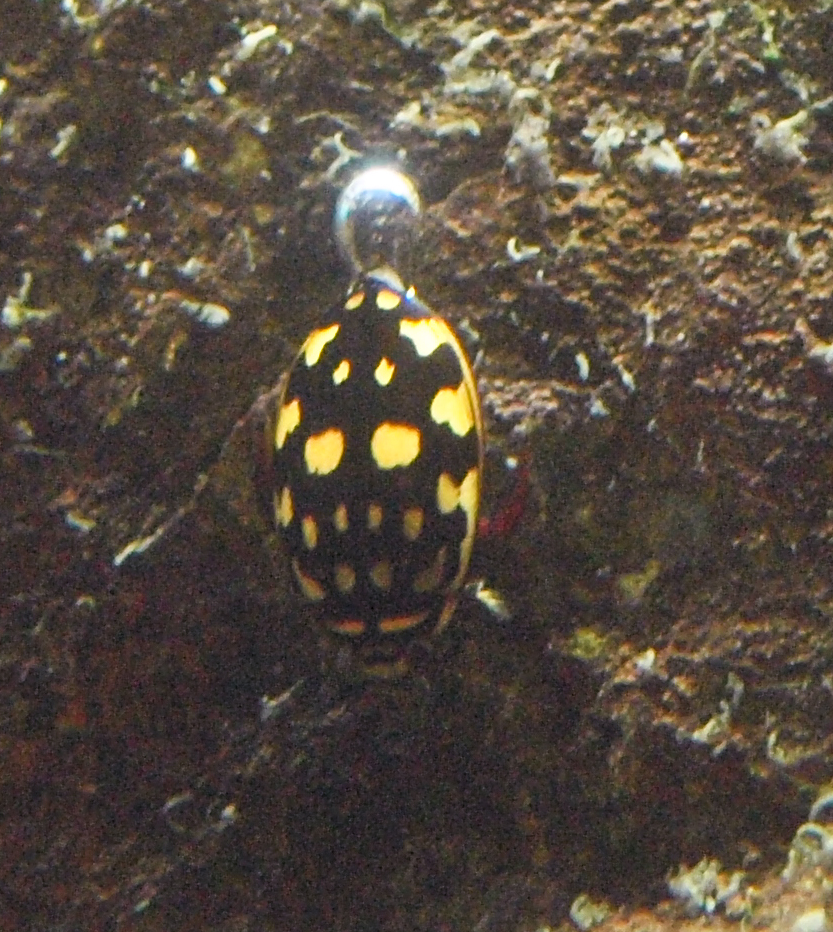
- Thermonectus marmoratus

Scientific classification
- Kingdom: Animalia
- Phylum: Arthropoda
- Clade: Pancrustacea
- Class: Insecta
- Order: Coleoptera
- Suborder: Adephaga
- Family: Dytiscidae
- Subfamily: Dytiscinae
- Tribe: Aciliini
- Genus: Thermonectus; Dejean, 1833

= Thermonectus =

Genus of beetles

Thermonectus is a genus of beetles in the family Dytiscidae. This genus is native to the New World, and mainly from warm temperate to tropical in distribution, but one species, T. basillaris occurs as far north as southern Ontario, Canada. They inhabit a wide range of freshwater habitats with static water and are often common. They are generally about 0.8–1.5 cm (0.3–0.6 in) long and a few species from desert pools in North America have a distinct yellow-spotted pattern on a black background.

== Species ==
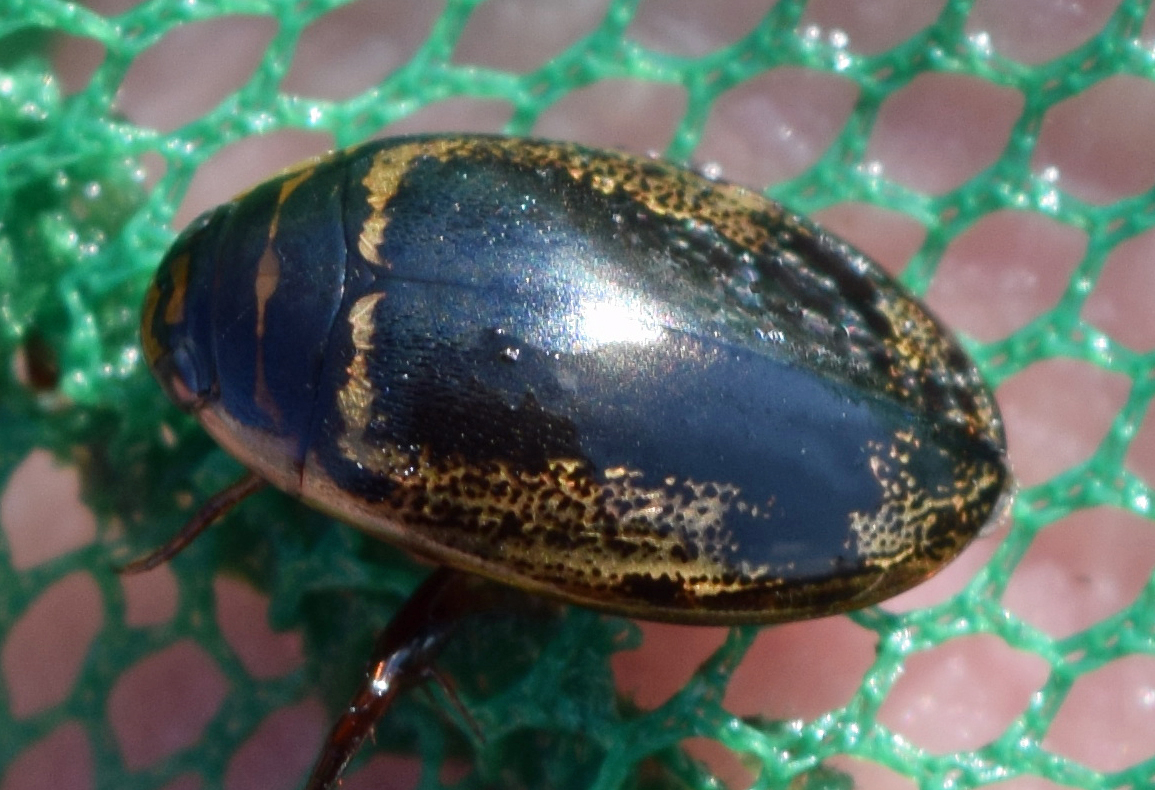
Thermonectus basillaris

Thermonectus contains the following 20 species:

- Thermonectus alfredi Griffini, 1898
- Thermonectus basillaris (Harris, 1829)
- Thermonectus batesi Sharp, 1882
- Thermonectus circumscriptus (Latreille, 1809)
- Thermonectus cuneatus Sharp, 1882
- Thermonectus depictus Sharp, 1882
- Thermonectus duponti (Aubé, 1838)
- Thermonectus intermedius Crotch, 1873
- Thermonectus laporti (Aubé, 1838)
- Thermonectus leprieuri J. Balfour-Browne, 1944
- Thermonectus margineguttatus (Aubé, 1838)
- Thermonectus marmoratus (Gray, 1831)
- Thermonectus nigrofasciatus (Aubé, 1838)
- Thermonectus nobilis Zimmermann, 1924
- Thermonectus sibleyi Goodhue-McWilliams, 1981
- Thermonectus simulator Sharp, 1882
- Thermonectus succinctus (Aubé, 1838)
- Thermonectus tremouillesi Michat & Torres, 2016
- Thermonectus variegatus (Laporte, 1835)
- Thermonectus zimmermani Goodhue-McWilliams, 1981
