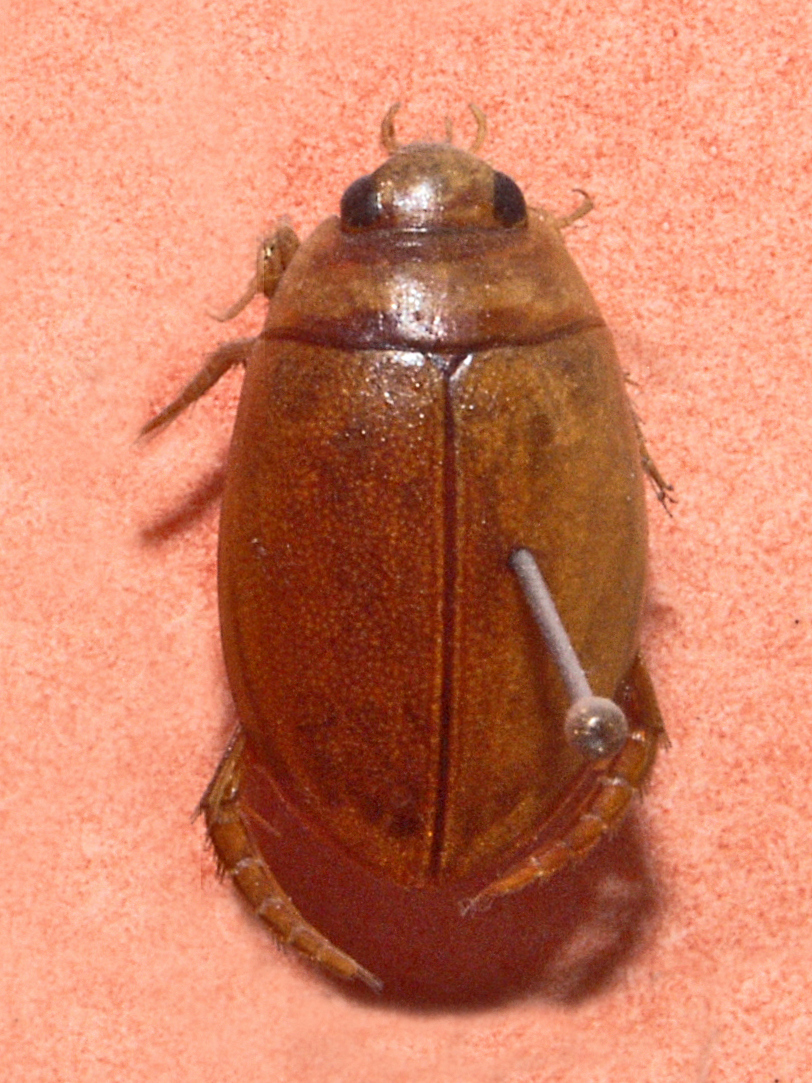
- Graphoderus austriacus. Museum specimen

Scientific classification
- Kingdom: Animalia
- Phylum: Arthropoda
- Clade: Pancrustacea
- Class: Insecta
- Order: Coleoptera
- Suborder: Adephaga
- Family: Dytiscidae
- Genus: Graphoderus
- Species: G. austriacus

Binomial name
- Graphoderus austriacus (Sturm, 1834)

= Graphoderus austriacus =

Species of beetle

Graphoderus austriacus is a species of beetle in family Dytiscidae.

== Description ==
Graphoderus austriacus can reach a length of about 13.5 millimetres (0.53 in). Body is broadly oval. There is a small transverse fascia on the pronotum.

== Distribution ==
This species is present in Austria, Belarus, Belgium, Bosnia and Herzegovina, Bulgaria, Croatia, the Czech Republic, mainland Denmark, mainland France, Germany, Hungary, Italy, Kaliningrad, Latvia, Moldova, Poland, Russia (Central, East and South), Slovakia, Slovenia, Sweden, Switzerland, Ukraine, and Yugoslavia.

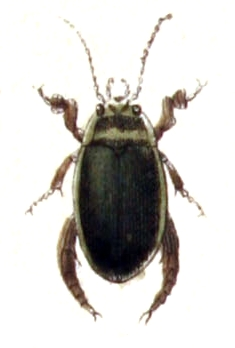
Illustration from Calwer's Käferbuch

== Bibliography ==
- Nilsson, Anders N. (2001), World Catalogue of Insects, volume 3: Dytiscidae (Coleoptera)
- ITIS: The Integrated Taxonomic Information System.
