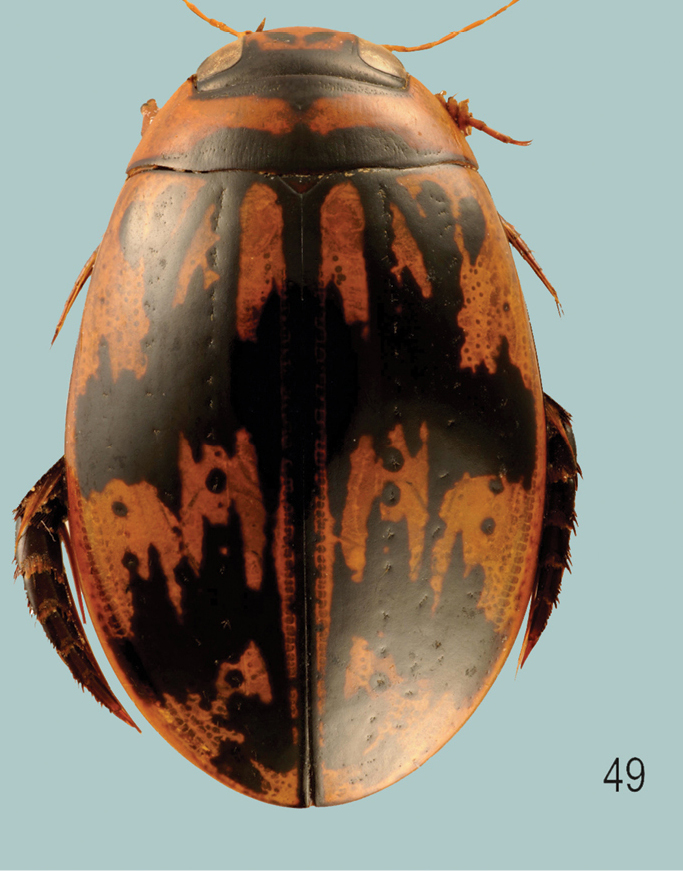

Scientific classification
- Kingdom: Animalia
- Phylum: Arthropoda
- Clade: Pancrustacea
- Class: Insecta
- Order: Coleoptera
- Suborder: Adephaga
- Family: Dytiscidae
- Genus: Sandracottus
- Species: S. chevrolati

Binomial name
- Sandracottus chevrolati Aubé, 1838

Synonyms
- Sandracottux mixtus

= Sandracottus chevrolati =

Species of beetles

Sandracottus chevrolati is a species of beetle in the family Dytiscidae that occurs in Indonesia with records from the Lesser Sunda Island, Timor, Tanimbar, and central and southern Sulawesi.
