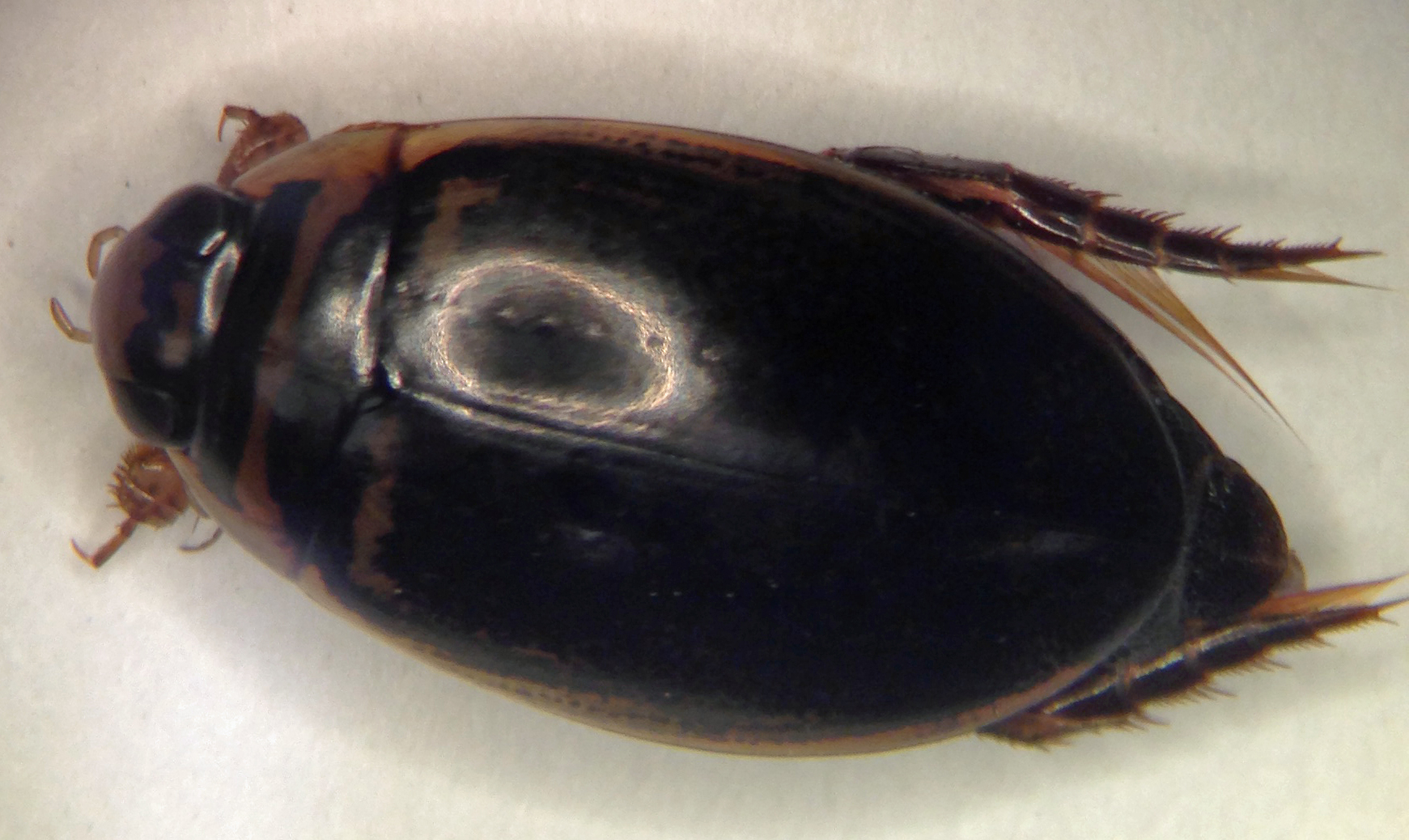

Scientific classification
- Domain: Eukaryota
- Kingdom: Animalia
- Phylum: Arthropoda
- Class: Insecta
- Order: Coleoptera
- Suborder: Adephaga
- Family: Dytiscidae
- Genus: Thermonectus
- Species: T. basillaris

Binomial name
- Thermonectus basillaris Harris, 1829

= Thermonectus basillaris =

Species of beetle

Thermonectus basillaris is a species of diving beetle native to the eastern United States, southern Ontario, Canada, and Cuba. T. basillaris is a pioneering species that occurs in temporary ponds and readily fly. Adults are 8.1 to 10.7 millimetres (0.32 to 0.42 in) long and 4.7 to 5.9 millimetres (0.19 to 0.23 in) wide.
