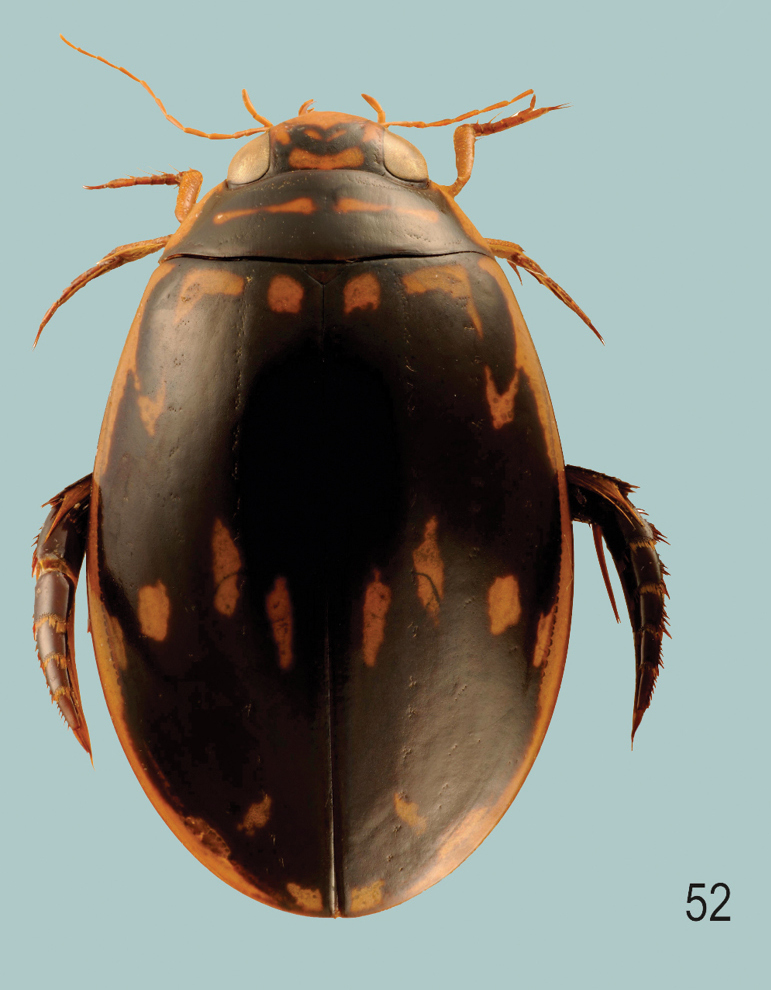

Scientific classification
- Kingdom: Animalia
- Phylum: Arthropoda
- Class: Insecta
- Order: Coleoptera
- Suborder: Adephaga
- Family: Dytiscidae
- Genus: Sandracottus
- Species: S. femoralis

Binomial name
- Sandracottus femoralis Heller, 1934

Synonyms
- Sandracottus flavocinctus Sandracottus guerini

= Sandracottus femoralis =

Species of beetles

Sandracottus femoralis is a species of beetle in the family Dytiscidae that occurs in Indonesia (Moluccas, Irian Jaya), Papua New Guinea, and the Solomon Islands.
