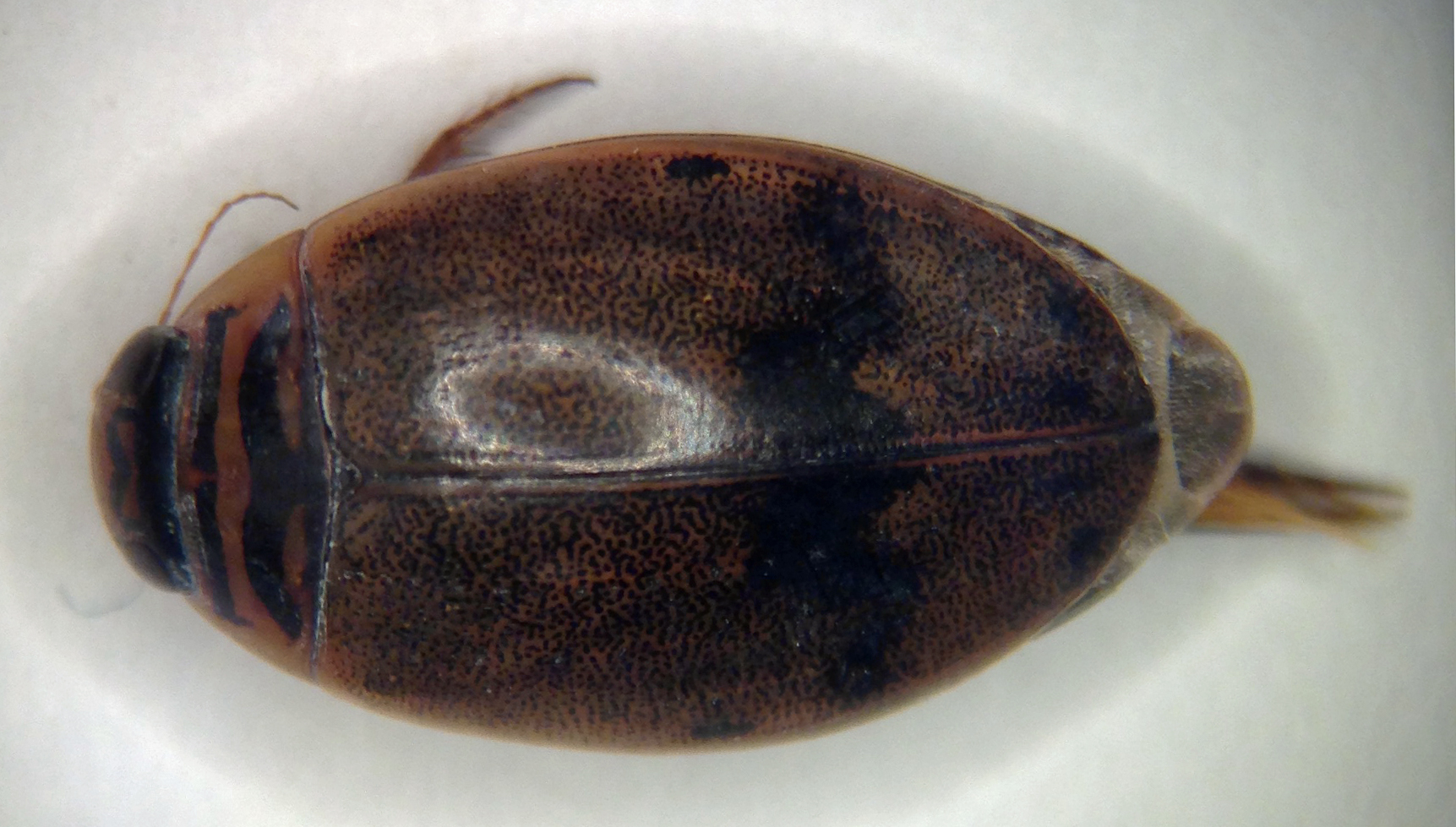
- Dorsal side of female T. nigrofasciatus

Scientific classification
- Domain: Eukaryota
- Kingdom: Animalia
- Phylum: Arthropoda
- Class: Insecta
- Order: Coleoptera
- Suborder: Adephaga
- Family: Dytiscidae
- Genus: Thermonectus
- Species: T. nigrofasciatus

Binomial name
- Thermonectus nigrofasciatus (Aubé, 1838)

= Thermonectus nigrofasciatus =

Species of beetle

Thermonectus nigrofasciatus is a species of diving beetle native to the eastern United States. T. nigrofasciatus is distinguished by its black, postmedian transverse blotch on its elytra, hence "nigrofasciatus."

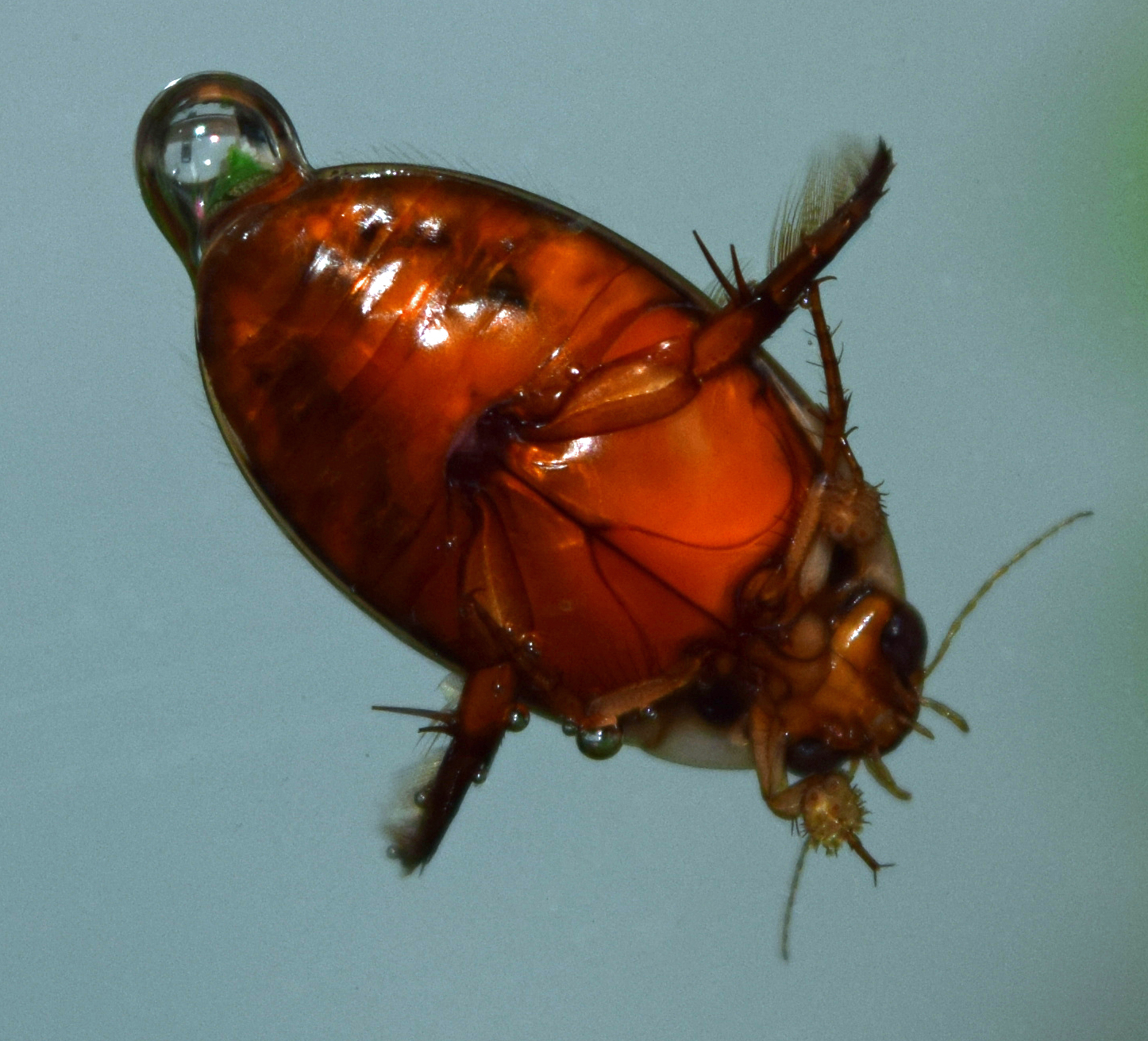
Ventral side of a male with an air bubble, which they carry underwater to breathe
