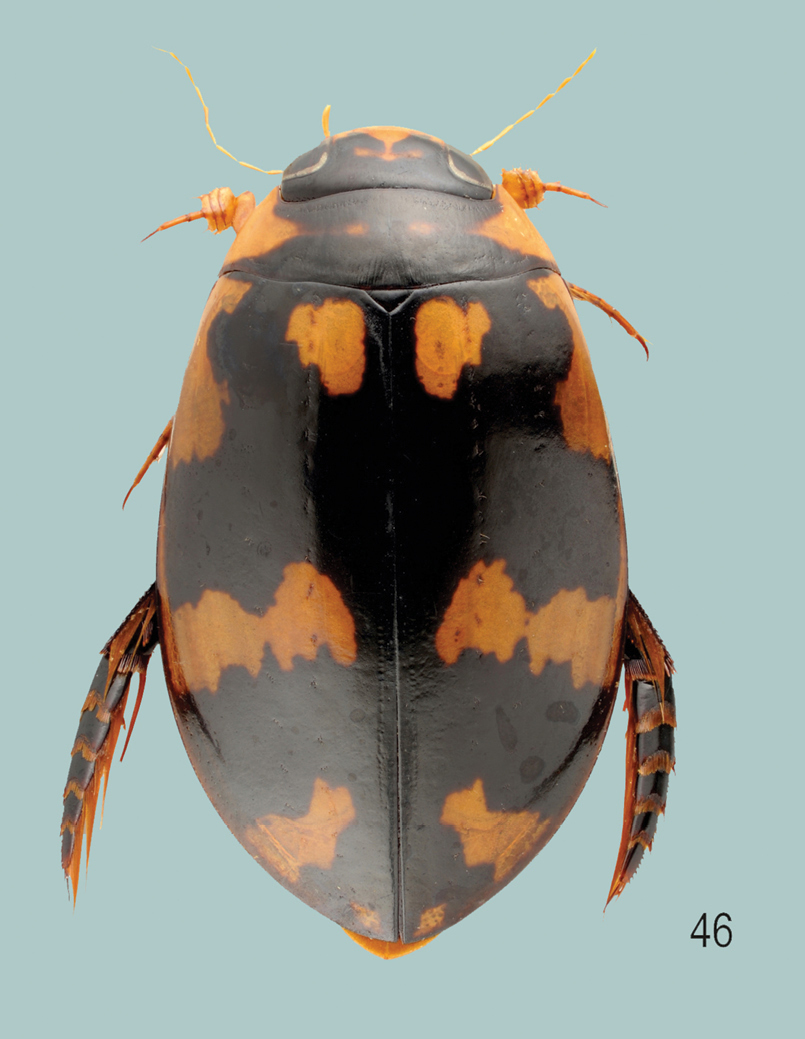

Scientific classification
- Domain: Eukaryota
- Kingdom: Animalia
- Phylum: Arthropoda
- Class: Insecta
- Order: Coleoptera
- Suborder: Adephaga
- Family: Dytiscidae
- Genus: Sandracottus
- Species: S. bakewellii

Binomial name
- Sandracottus bakewellii (Clark, 1864)

= Sandracottus bakewellii =

Species of beetles

Sandracottus bakewellii is a species of beetle in the family Dytiscidae that occurs in Australia. The nominate subspecies occurs northern and coastal eastern Australia, while S. bakewellii guttatus occurs in central Australia.

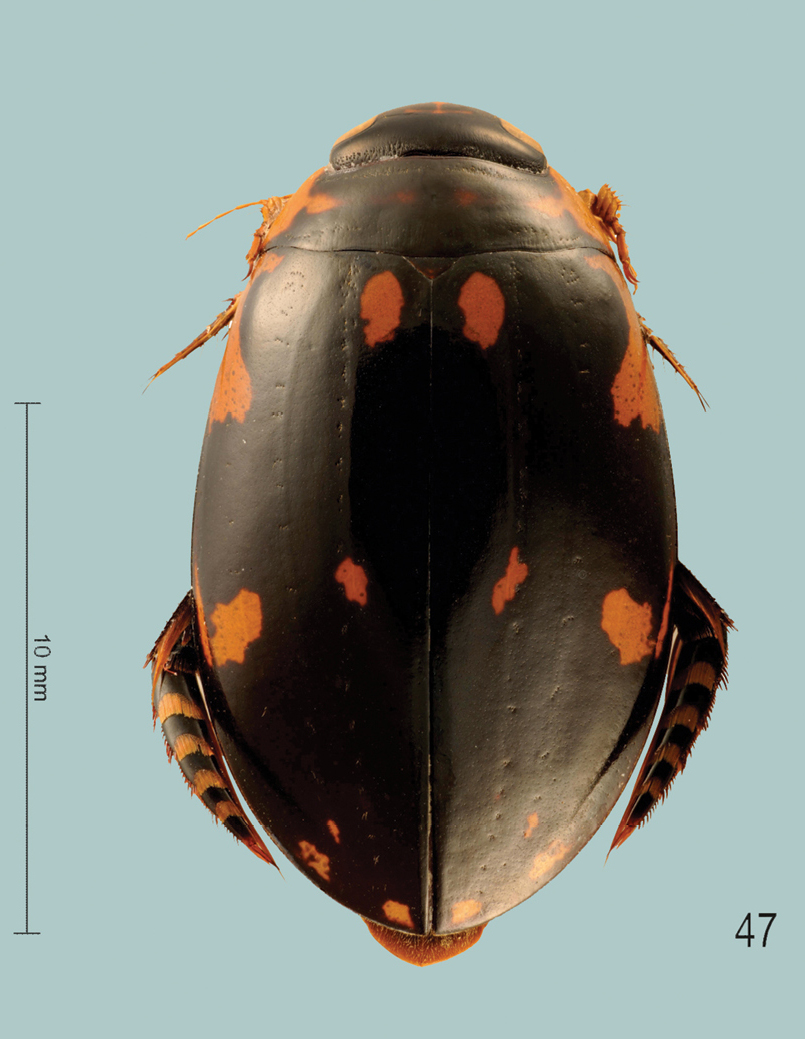
Sandracottus bakewellii guttatus
