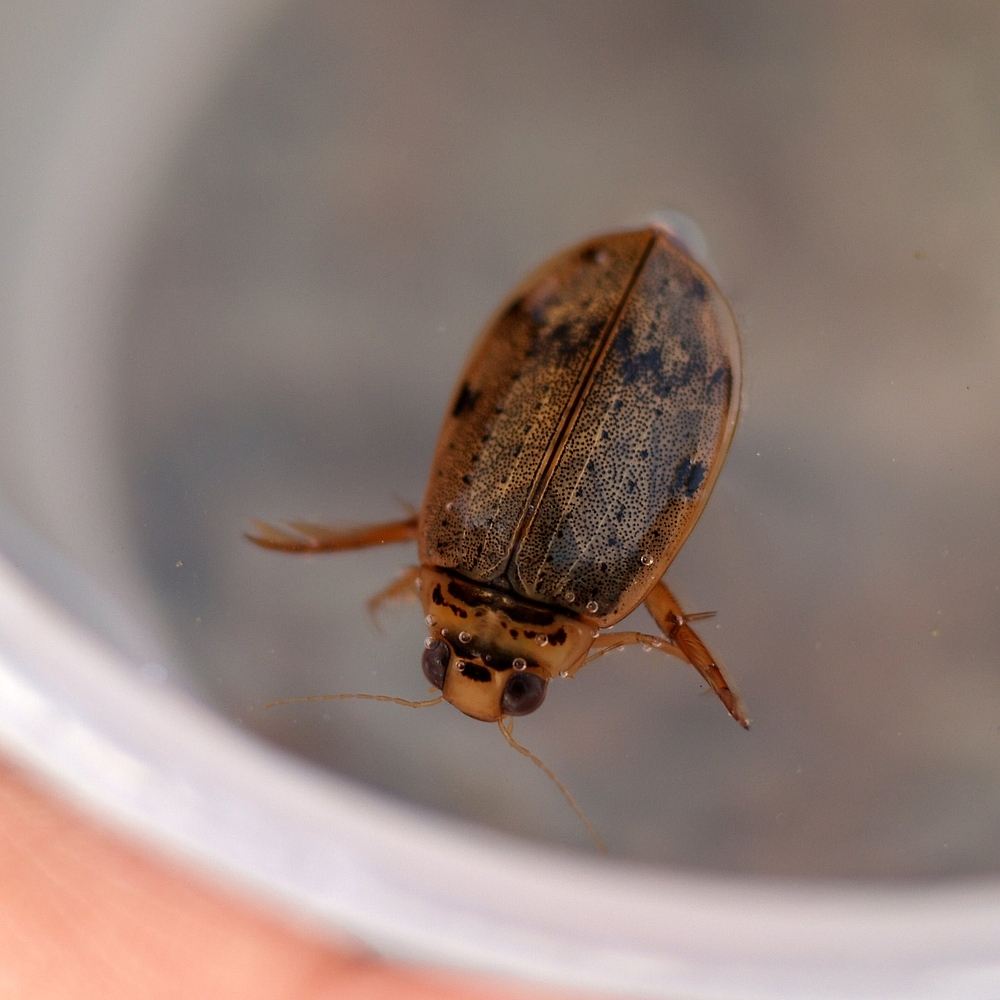
- Eretes sticticus

Scientific classification
- Domain: Eukaryota
- Kingdom: Animalia
- Phylum: Arthropoda
- Class: Insecta
- Order: Coleoptera
- Suborder: Adephaga
- Family: Dytiscidae
- Tribe: Eretini
- Genus: Eretes; Laporte, 1833

Species
- 4

= Eretes =

Genus of beetles

Eretes is a genus of beetles in the family Dytiscidae. The genus is native to the Afro-tropical region, the Palearctic (including Europe), the Near East, North Africa and the Asian region.

A 2002 revision of the genus established four species. Species of this genus are variable in size and color, and individuals of a given species can be varied in appearance as well, so the morphology of the male genitalia is used to delimit species.

The beetles are yellowish in color with black markings. They have large heads with long antennae.

Species:

- Eretes australis (Erichson, 1842)
- Eretes explicitus K.B.Miller, 2002
- Eretes griseus (Fabricius, 1781)
- Eretes sticticus (Linnaeus, 1767)
