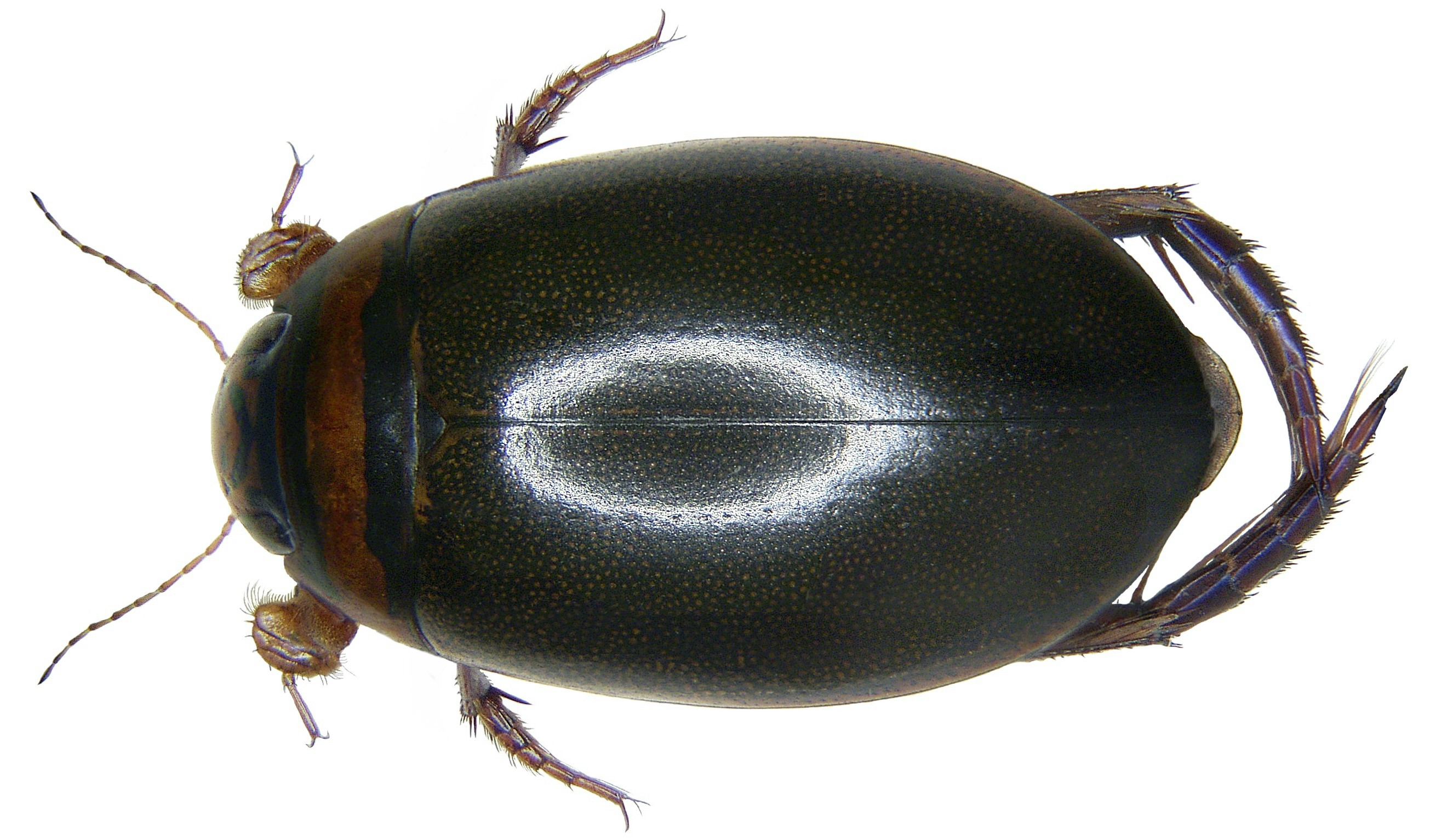
- G. cinereus

Scientific classification
- Domain: Eukaryota
- Kingdom: Animalia
- Phylum: Arthropoda
- Class: Insecta
- Order: Coleoptera
- Suborder: Adephaga
- Family: Dytiscidae
- Tribe: Aciliini
- Genus: Graphoderus; Dejean, 1833

= Graphoderus =

Genus of beetles

Graphoderus is a genus of beetle in family Dytiscidae native to the Holarctic.

== Extant species ==
The genus Graphoderus contains the following 12 species:

- Graphoderus adamsii (Clark, 1864)
- Graphoderus austriacus (Sturm, 1834)
- Graphoderus bieneri Zimmermann, 1921
- Graphoderus bilineatus (De Geer, 1774)
- Graphoderus cinereus (Linnaeus, 1758)
- Graphoderus elatus Sharp, 1882
- Graphoderus fascicollis (Harris, 1828)
- Graphoderus liberus (Say, 1825)
- Graphoderus manitobensis Wallis, 1933
- Graphoderus occidentalis Horn, 1883
- Graphoderus perplexus Sharp, 1882
- Graphoderus zonatus (Hoppe, 1795)

== Extinct species ==
These two extinct species are known only from fossils:

- †Graphoderus heeri Nilsson, 2001
- †Graphoderus mirabilis Riha, 1974
