= Tikoloshanes =

Tikoloshanes eretiformis

Scientific classification
- Kingdom: Animalia
- Phylum: Arthropoda
- Class: Insecta
- Order: Coleoptera
- Suborder: Adephaga
- Family: Dytiscidae
- Genus: Tikoloshanes; Omer-Cooper, 1956
- Species: T. eretiformis

Binomial name
- Tikoloshanes eretiformis Omer-Cooper, 1956

Genus of beetles

Tikoloshanes eretiformis is a species of beetle in the family Dytiscidae, the only species in the genus Tikoloshanes. This species has rarely been collected and is known only from South Africa and southern Mozambique.
