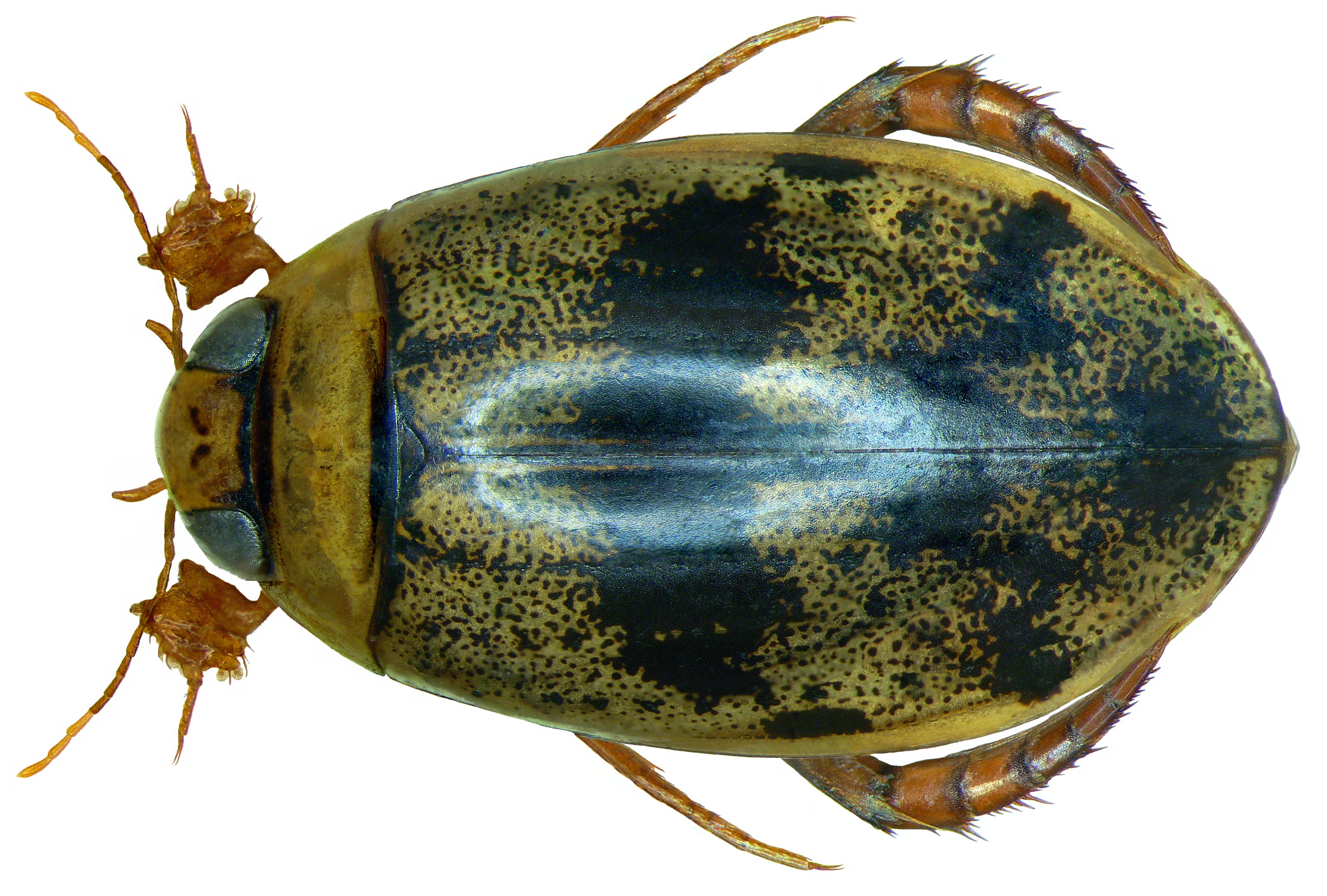
- Rhantaticus congestus

Scientific classification
- Kingdom: Animalia
- Phylum: Arthropoda
- Class: Insecta
- Order: Coleoptera
- Suborder: Adephaga
- Family: Dytiscidae
- Genus: Rhantaticus; Sharp, 1882
- Species: R. congestus

Binomial name
- Rhantaticus congestus (Klug, 1833)

= Rhantaticus =

Genus of beetles

Rhantaticus congestus is a species of beetle in the family Dytiscidae, the only species in the genus Rhantaticus. The current definition of R. congestus makes it one of the most widespread dytiscid species in the world, found throughout much of Africa, the Middle East, India, Southeast Asia, and the Philippines to Australia. However, the definition of the genus containing a single species may change as it becomes better understood.
