= Aethionectes =

Scientific classification
- Kingdom: Animalia
- Phylum: Arthropoda
- Class: Insecta
- Order: Coleoptera
- Suborder: Adephaga
- Family: Dytiscidae
- Genus: Aethionectes; Sharp, 1882

Genus of beetles

Aethionectes is a genus of beetles in the family Dytiscidae found in sub-Saharan Africa and Madagascar.

The genus Aethionectes contains the following six species:

- Aethionectes apicalis (Boheman, 1848)
- Aethionectes eremita Bilardo & Rocchi, 2017
- Aethionectes flammulatus Zimmermann, 1928
- Aethionectes fulvonotatus (Clark, 1864)
- Aethionectes irroratus Guignot, 1952
- Aethionectes oberthueri (Régimbart, 1895)
