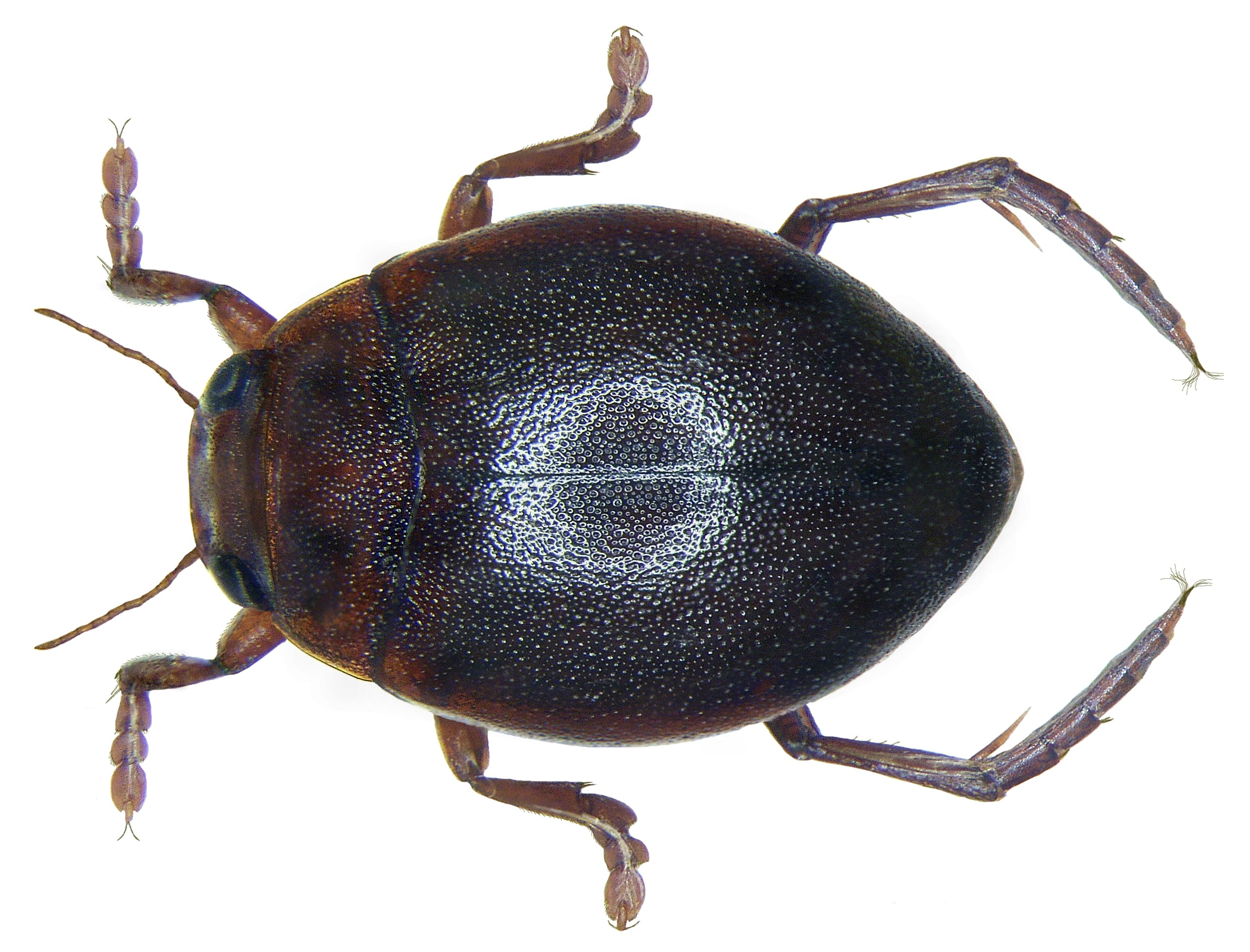
- Hyphydrus ovatus

Scientific classification
- Domain: Eukaryota
- Kingdom: Animalia
- Phylum: Arthropoda
- Class: Insecta
- Order: Coleoptera
- Suborder: Adephaga
- Family: Dytiscidae
- Subfamily: Hydroporinae
- Tribe: Hyphydrini
- Genus: Hyphydrus; Illiger, 1802

= Hyphydrus =

Genus of beetles

Hyphydrus is a genus of diving beetle native to the Palearctic (including Europe), the Afro-tropical region, the Near East, North Africa. It contains the following species:

- Hyphydrus abyssinicus Peschet, 1916
- Hyphydrus aequatorialis Biström, 1983
- Hyphydrus agnitus Guignot, 1952
- Hyphydrus alfredi Bilardo & Rocchi, 1986
- Hyphydrus alluaudi Régimbart, 1889
- Hyphydrus amplimaculatus Bilardo & Rocchi, 1995
- Hyphydrus anatolicus Guignot, 1957
- Hyphydrus assinicus Régimbart, 1889
- Hyphydrus ater Bilardo, 1982
- Hyphydrus aubei Ganglbauer, 1891
- Hyphydrus barysomus Guignot, 1959
- Hyphydrus bigamus Guignot, 1956
- Hyphydrus birmanicus Régimbart, 1888
- Hyphydrus bistrimaculatus Biström, Hendrich & Kirk-Spriggs, 1997
- Hyphydrus bistroemi Bilardo & Rocchi, 1986
- Hyphydrus boettcheri Biström, 1982
- Hyphydrus brancuccii Biström, 1981
- Hyphydrus burgeoni Gschwendtner, 1930
- Hyphydrus caffer Boheman, 1848
- Hyphydrus camerunensis Biström, 1982
- Hyphydrus caryerus Guignot, 1942
- Hyphydrus celebensis Biström, 1983
- Hyphydrus celox Biström, 1987
- Hyphydrus ceramensis Wewalka & Biström, 1993
- Hyphydrus circumflexus Klug, 1853
- Hyphydrus coccinelloides Zimmermann, 1923
- Hyphydrus concii Bilardo & Rocchi, 1986
- Hyphydrus congoanus Biström, 1982
- Hyphydrus conradsi Gschwendtner, 1933
- Hyphydrus contiguus Wehncke, 1877
- Hyphydrus cuppeni Biström, 1984
- Hyphydrus cycloides Régimbart, 1889
- Hyphydrus dani Biström, Balke & Hendrich, 1993
- Hyphydrus decemmaculatus Wehncke, 1877
- Hyphydrus delibatus Guignot, 1947
- Hyphydrus detectus Falkenström, 1936
- Hyphydrus dissimilis Biström, 1983
- Hyphydrus distinctus Aubé, 1838
- Hyphydrus ditylus Guignot, 1953
- Hyphydrus dongba Stastný, 2000
- Hyphydrus eldenbecki Biström, 1982
- Hyphydrus elegans (Montrouzier, 1860)
- Hyphydrus eremita Guignot, 1954
- Hyphydrus esau Biström, 1982
- Hyphydrus essoni Bilardo & Rocchi, 1995
- Hyphydrus excoffieri Régimbart, 1899
- Hyphydrus facilis Biström, 1987
- Hyphydrus falkenstromi Gschwendtner, 1939
- Hyphydrus fangensis Biström & Satô, 1988
- Hyphydrus flaviceps Zimmermann, 1926
- Hyphydrus fluviatilis Pederzani, 1988
- Hyphydrus funebris Guignot, 1956
- Hyphydrus fuscus Omer-Cooper, 1931
- Hyphydrus gabonicus Régimbart, 1895
- Hyphydrus gibbosus Biström, 1984
- Hyphydrus grandis Laporte, 1835
- Hyphydrus gschwendtneri Guignot, 1942
- Hyphydrus holmeni Biström, 1983
- Hyphydrus holomelas Biström, 1984
- Hyphydrus humilis Bilardo & Rocchi, 1995
- Hyphydrus imitator Biström, 1984
- Hyphydrus impressus Klug, 1833
- Hyphydrus inopinatus Omer-Cooper, 1971
- Hyphydrus intermixtus (Walker, 1858)
- Hyphydrus jacobsoni Biström, 1982
- Hyphydrus jaechi Wewalka & Biström, 1989
- Hyphydrus japonicus Sharp, 1873
- Hyphydrus keiseri Mouchamps, 1959
- Hyphydrus komghaensis Omer-Cooper, 1965
- Hyphydrus laeviventris Sharp, 1882
- Hyphydrus lanzai Bilardo & Rocchi, 1986
- Hyphydrus lasiosternus Guignot, 1942
- Hyphydrus lentiginosus Guignot, 1935
- Hyphydrus linnavuorii Biström, 1982
- Hyphydrus loriae Régimbart, 1892
- Hyphydrus lyratus Swartz, 1808
- Hyphydrus maculatus Babington, 1841
- Hyphydrus maculiceps Régimbart, 1906
- Hyphydrus maculifer Guignot, 1959
- Hyphydrus madagascariensis Wehncke, 1877
- Hyphydrus malkini Guignot, 1959
- Hyphydrus mbandouensis Bilardo & Rocchi, 1990
- Hyphydrus megas Biström, 2000
- Hyphydrus microreticulatus Bilardo & Rocchi, 1986
- Hyphydrus nasutus Bilardo & Pederzani, 1978
- Hyphydrus nigrovittatus Régimbart, 1906
- Hyphydrus occultus Bilardo & Rocchi, 1995
- Hyphydrus odiosus Guignot, 1952
- Hyphydrus omercooperae Guéorguiev, 1975
- Hyphydrus opaculus Régimbart, 1895
- Hyphydrus orientalis Clark, 1863
- Hyphydrus ovatus (Linnaeus, 1761)
- Hyphydrus parvicollis Sharp, 1882
- Hyphydrus pavani Bilardo & Rocchi, 1986
- Hyphydrus pederzanii Biström, 1982
- Hyphydrus perforatus Régimbart, 1895
- Hyphydrus pictus Klug, 1834
- Hyphydrus prinzi Wewalka & Biström, 1989
- Hyphydrus prozeskyi Biström, 1982
- Hyphydrus pulchellus Clark, 1863
- Hyphydrus puncticollis Sharp, 1882
- Hyphydrus quadriguttatus Guignot, 1956
- Hyphydrus quadrisulcatus Bilardo & Rocchi, 1986
- Hyphydrus renardi Severin, 1890
- Hyphydrus residuus Omer-Cooper, 1971
- Hyphydrus sanctus Sharp, 1882
- Hyphydrus satyrus Bilardo & Pederzani, 1978
- Hyphydrus schoedli Wewalka & Biström, 1993
- Hyphydrus schoutedeni Gschwendtner, 1930
- Hyphydrus scriptus (Fabricius, 1798)
- Hyphydrus separandus Régimbart, 1895
- Hyphydrus signatus Sharp, 1882
- Hyphydrus silfverbergi Biström, 1982
- Hyphydrus silvanus Bilardo, 1982
- Hyphydrus sjoestedti Biström, 1982
- Hyphydrus solivagus Bilardo & Rocchi, 1999
- Hyphydrus soni Biström, 1982
- Hyphydrus spangleri Biström, 1985
- Hyphydrus sphaeroidalis Biström, 1982
- Hyphydrus stipator Guignot, 1942
- Hyphydrus stipes Sharp, 1882
- Hyphydrus subsignatus Bilardo & Rocchi, 1990
- Hyphydrus sumatrae Régimbart, 1880
- Hyphydrus sylvester Guignot, 1955
- Hyphydrus tristiculus Guignot, 1951
- Hyphydrus trophis Guignot, 1955
- Hyphydrus tuberosus Guignot, 1954
- Hyphydrus variolosus Régimbart, 1906
- Hyphydrus vassalloi Bilardo & Rocchi, 1990
- Hyphydrus villiersi Guignot, 1948
- Hyphydrus wittei Gschwendtner, 1938
- Hyphydrus zambiensis Pederzani, 1988

== Gallery ==
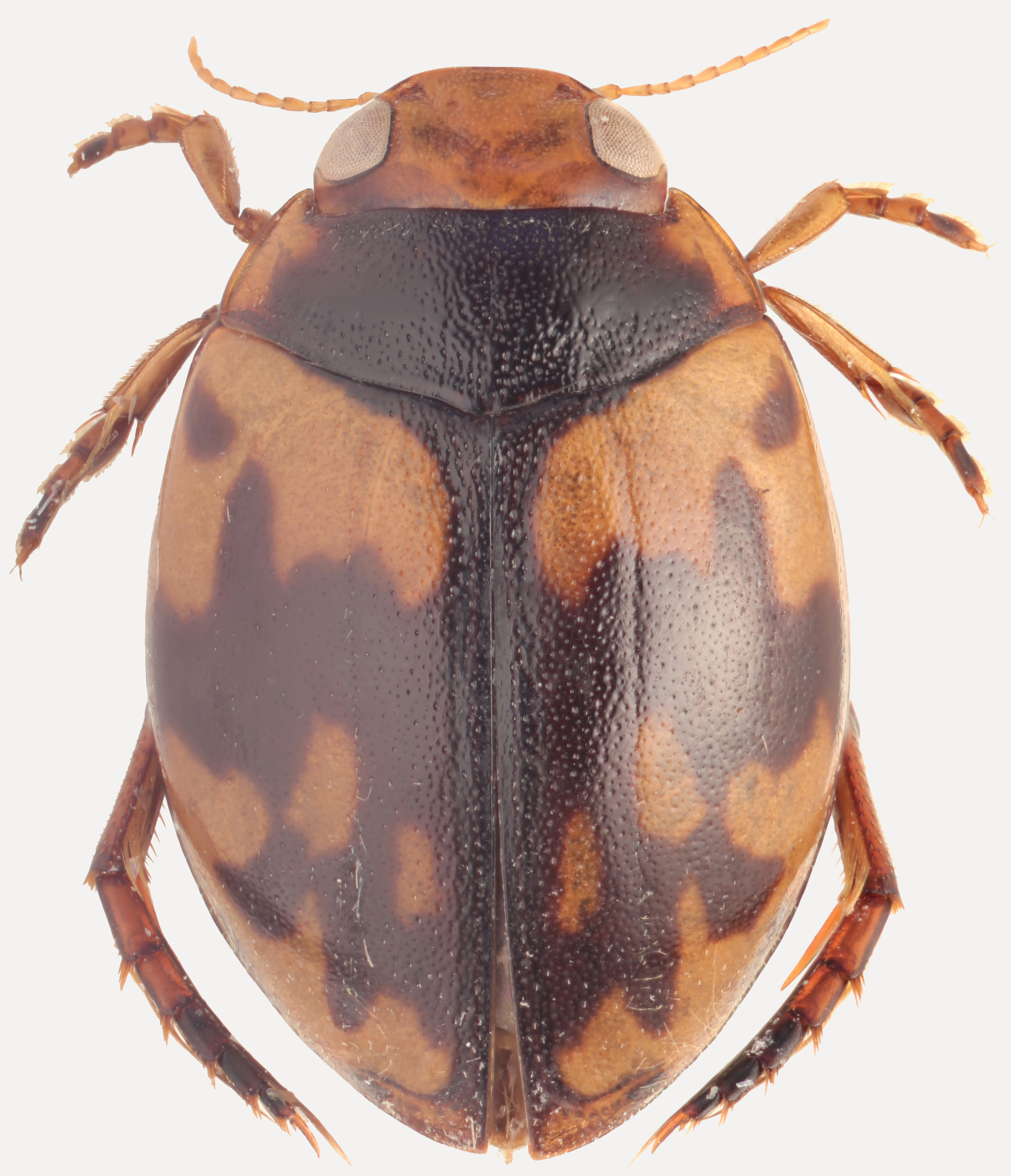
Hyphydrus pictus from the United Arab Emirates

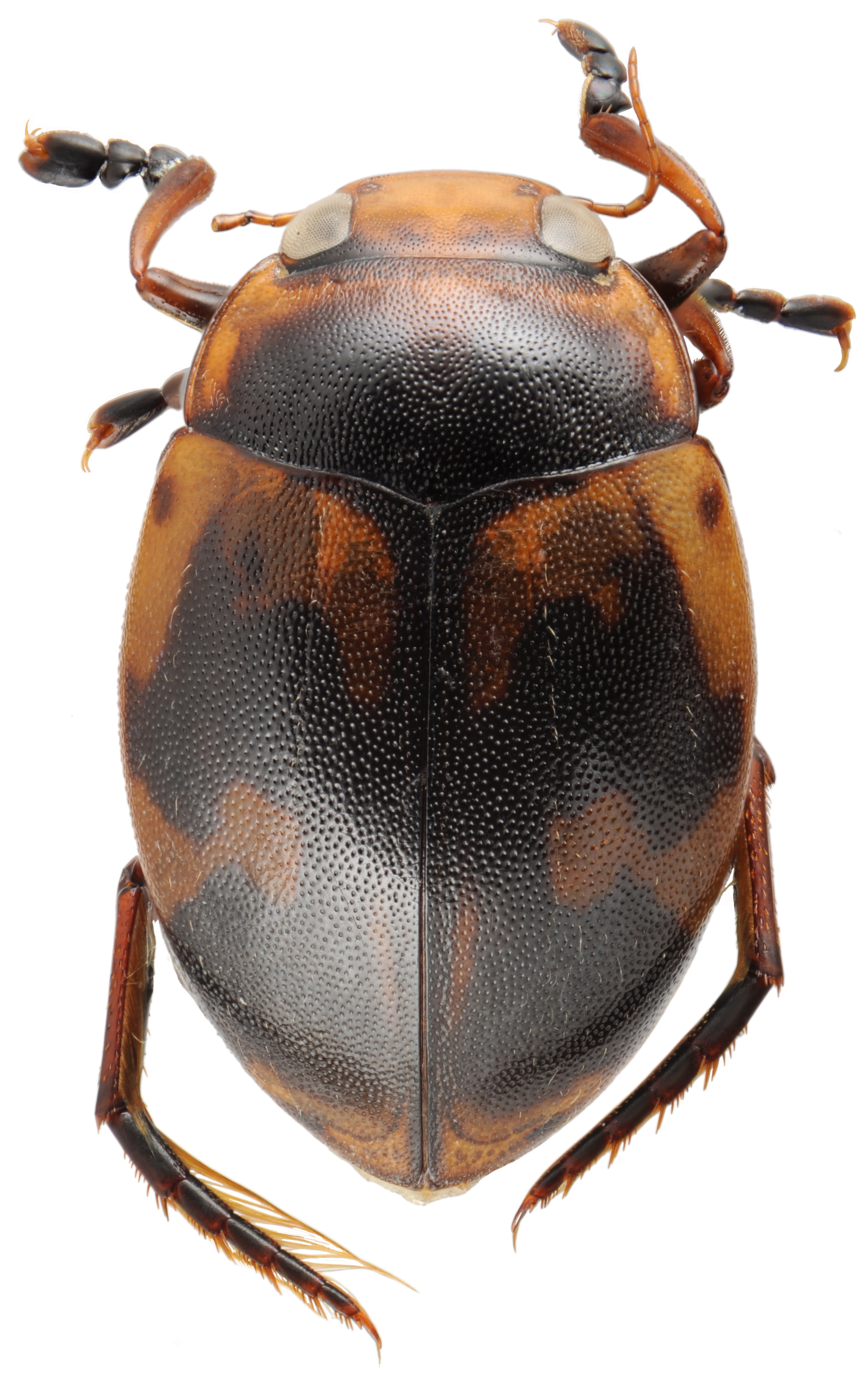
Hyphydrus elegans from Papua New Guinea

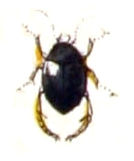
Hyphydrus ovatus from Calwer's Käferbuch, Table 8,

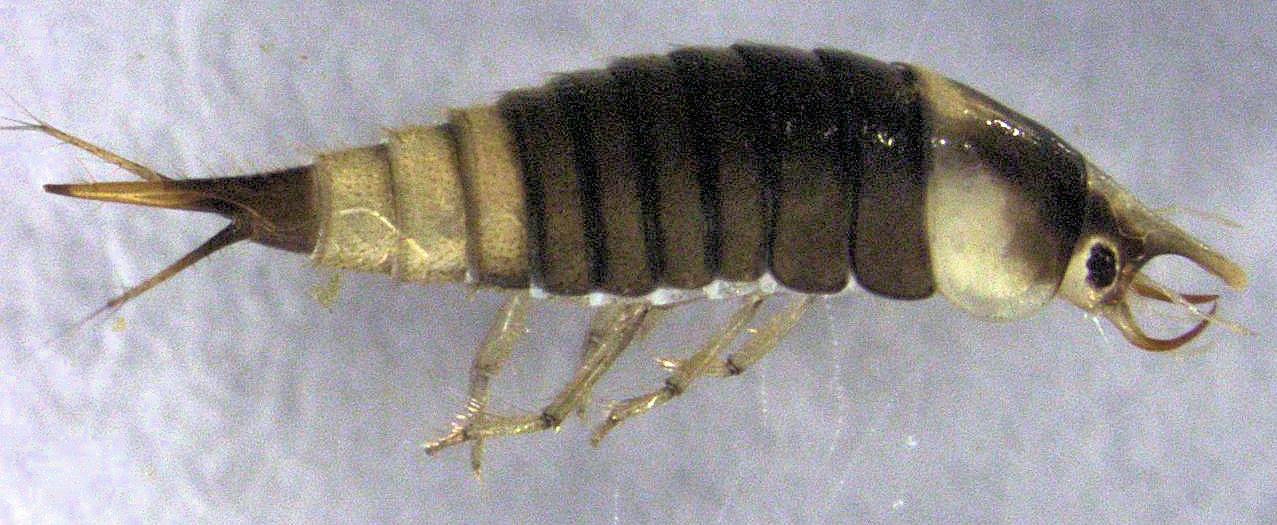
Larva of Hyphydrus elegans from New Zealand
