= Hydrovatus ischyrus =

Scientific classification
- Kingdom: Animalia
- Phylum: Arthropoda
- Class: Insecta
- Order: Coleoptera
- Suborder: Adephaga
- Family: Dytiscidae
- Genus: Hydrovatus
- Species: H. ischyrus

Binomial name
- Hydrovatus ischyrus Guignot, 1954

Species of beetle

Hydrovatus ischyrus is a species of predaceous diving beetle found in Sri Lanka.
