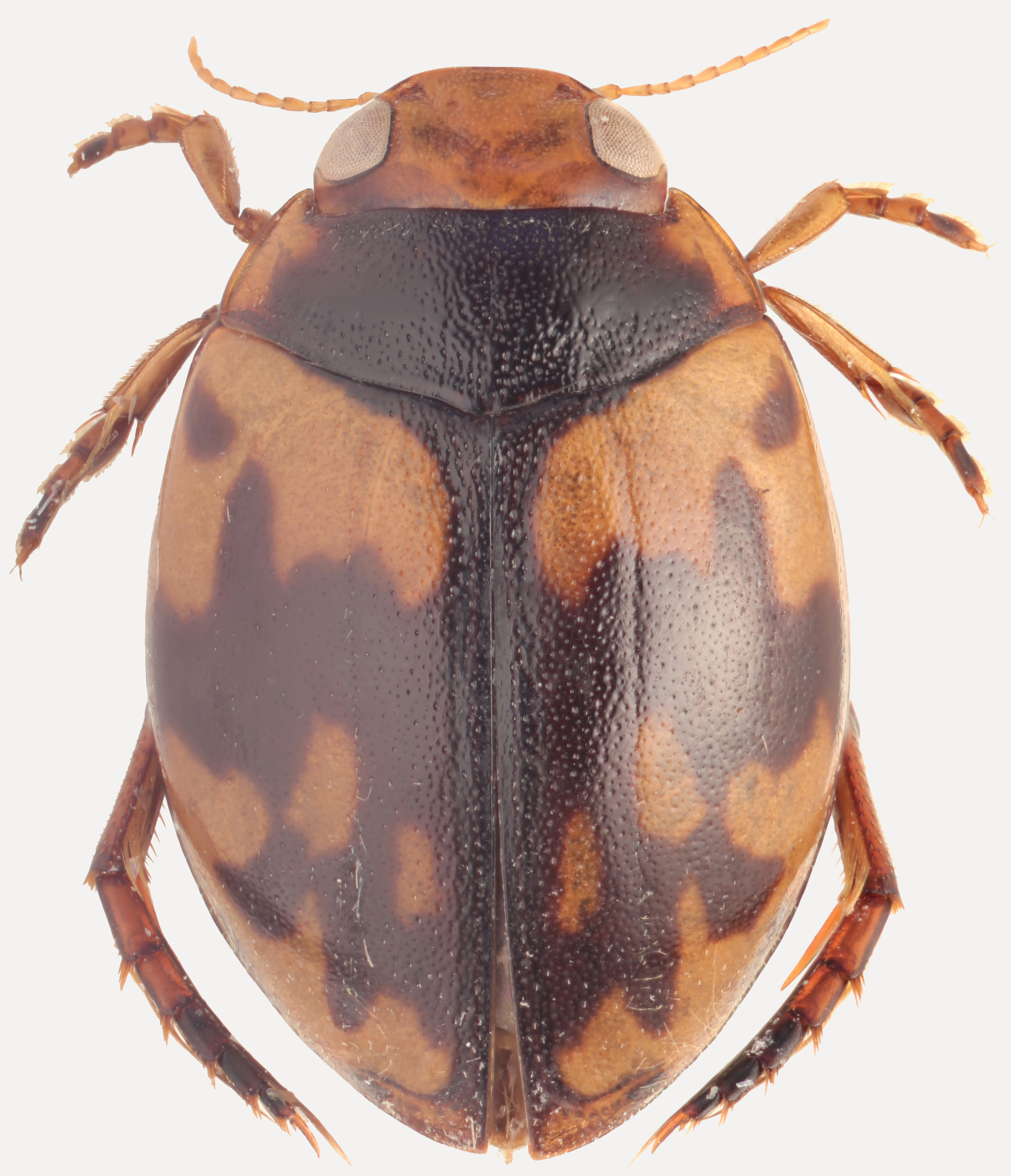

Scientific classification
- Kingdom: Animalia
- Phylum: Arthropoda
- Class: Insecta
- Order: Coleoptera
- Suborder: Adephaga
- Family: Dytiscidae
- Subfamily: Hydroporinae
- Tribe: Hyphydrini; Sharp, 1880

= Hyphydrini =

Tribe of beetles

Hyphydrini is a tribe of predaceous diving beetles in the family Dytiscidae. There are about 16 genera and more than 390 described species in Hyphydrini.

== Genera ==
These 16 genera belong to the tribe Hyphydrini:

- Agnoshydrus Biström, Nilsson & Wewalka, 1997
- Allopachria Zimmermann, 1924
- Andex Sharp, 1882
- Anginopachria Wewalka, Balke & Hendrich, 2001
- Coelhydrus Sharp, 1882
- Darwinhydrus Sharp, 1882
- Desmopachria Babington, 1841
- Dimitshydrus Uéno, 1996
- Heterhydrus Fairmaire, 1869
- Hovahydrus Biström, 1982
- Hydropeplus Sharp, 1882
- Hyphovatus Wewalka & Biström, 1994
- Hyphydrus Illiger, 1802
- Microdytes J. Balfour-Browne, 1946
- Pachydrus Sharp, 1882
- Primospes Sharp, 1882
