= Hydrovatus obtusus =

Scientific classification
- Kingdom: Animalia
- Phylum: Arthropoda
- Class: Insecta
- Order: Coleoptera
- Suborder: Adephaga
- Family: Dytiscidae
- Genus: Hydrovatus
- Species: H. obtusus

Binomial name
- Hydrovatus obtusus Motschulsky, 1855

Synonyms
- Hydrovatus acutus Sharp, 1882

Species of beetle

Hydrovatus obtusus, is a species of predaceous diving beetle found in Sri Lanka, Indonesia, Laos, Malaysia, Thailand, Vietnam and possibly in India, Myanmar and China.
