= Hyphydrus loriae =

Scientific classification
- Domain: Eukaryota
- Kingdom: Animalia
- Phylum: Arthropoda
- Class: Insecta
- Order: Coleoptera
- Suborder: Adephaga
- Family: Dytiscidae
- Genus: Hyphydrus
- Species: H. loriae

Binomial name
- Hyphydrus loriae Régimbart, 1892

Species of beetle

Hyphydrus loriae is a species of beetles of the family Dytiscidae.

== Description ==
Hyphydrus loriae can reach a length of 30–31 millimetres (1.2–1.2 in). Pronotum and elytra are blackish, while legs and antennae are reddish. These water beetles have oval, flattened and streamlined bodies adapted for aquatic life.

== Distribution ==
This species can be found in Papua New Guinea.
