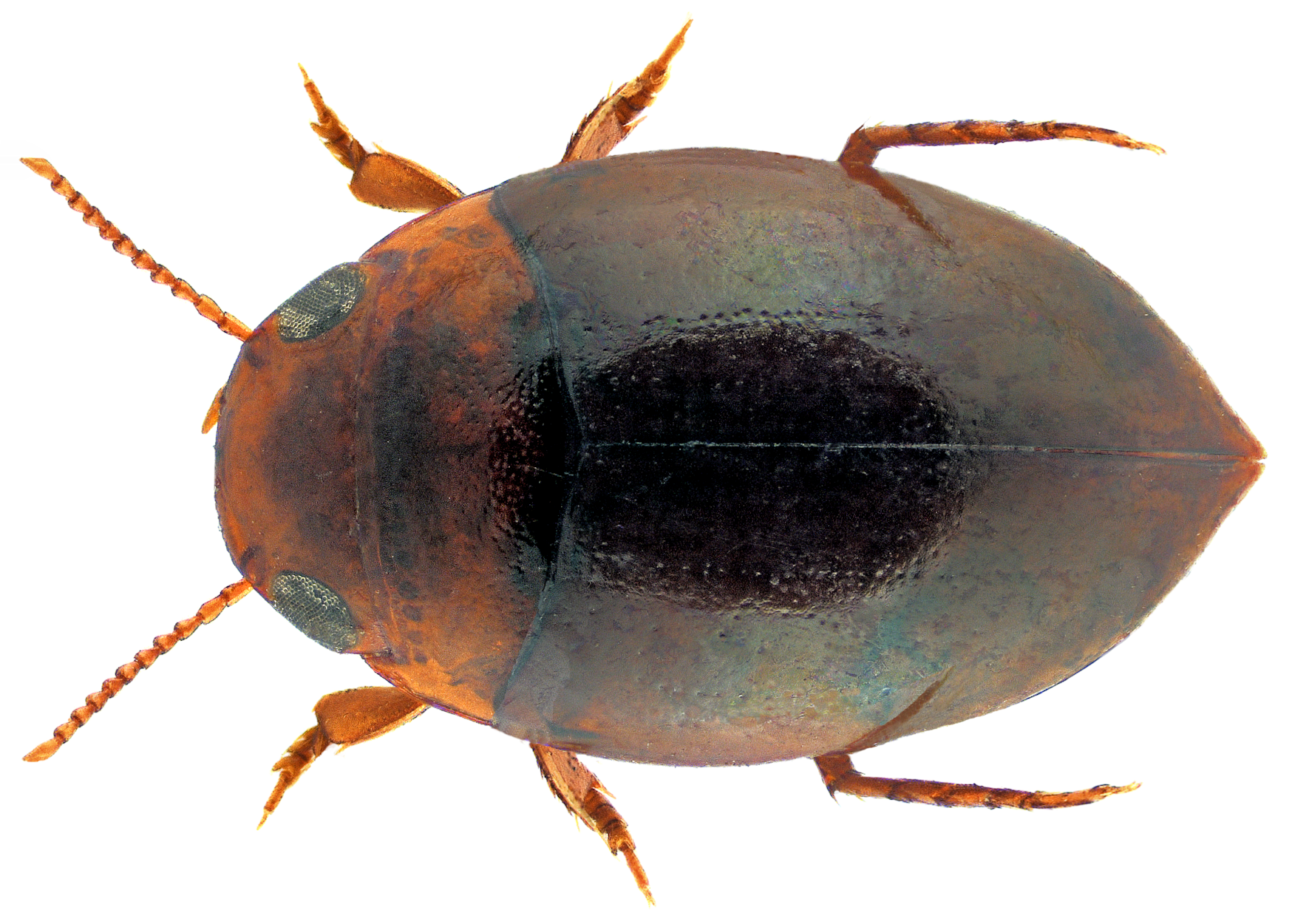
- Hydrovatus bonvouloiri

Scientific classification
- Kingdom: Animalia
- Phylum: Arthropoda
- Clade: Pancrustacea
- Class: Insecta
- Order: Coleoptera
- Suborder: Adephaga
- Family: Dytiscidae
- Genus: Hydrovatus
- Species: H. bonvouloiri

Binomial name
- Hydrovatus bonvouloiri Sharp, 1882

= Hydrovatus bonvouloiri =

Species of beetle

Hydrovatus bonvouloiri, is a species of predaceous diving beetle found in India, Sri Lanka, Malayasia, Myanmar, China, Japan, Vietnam, Formosa, Indonesia, Thailand, Laos, Taiwan, and Philippines.

Body is large with an average length of 3.5 to 3.7 mm.
