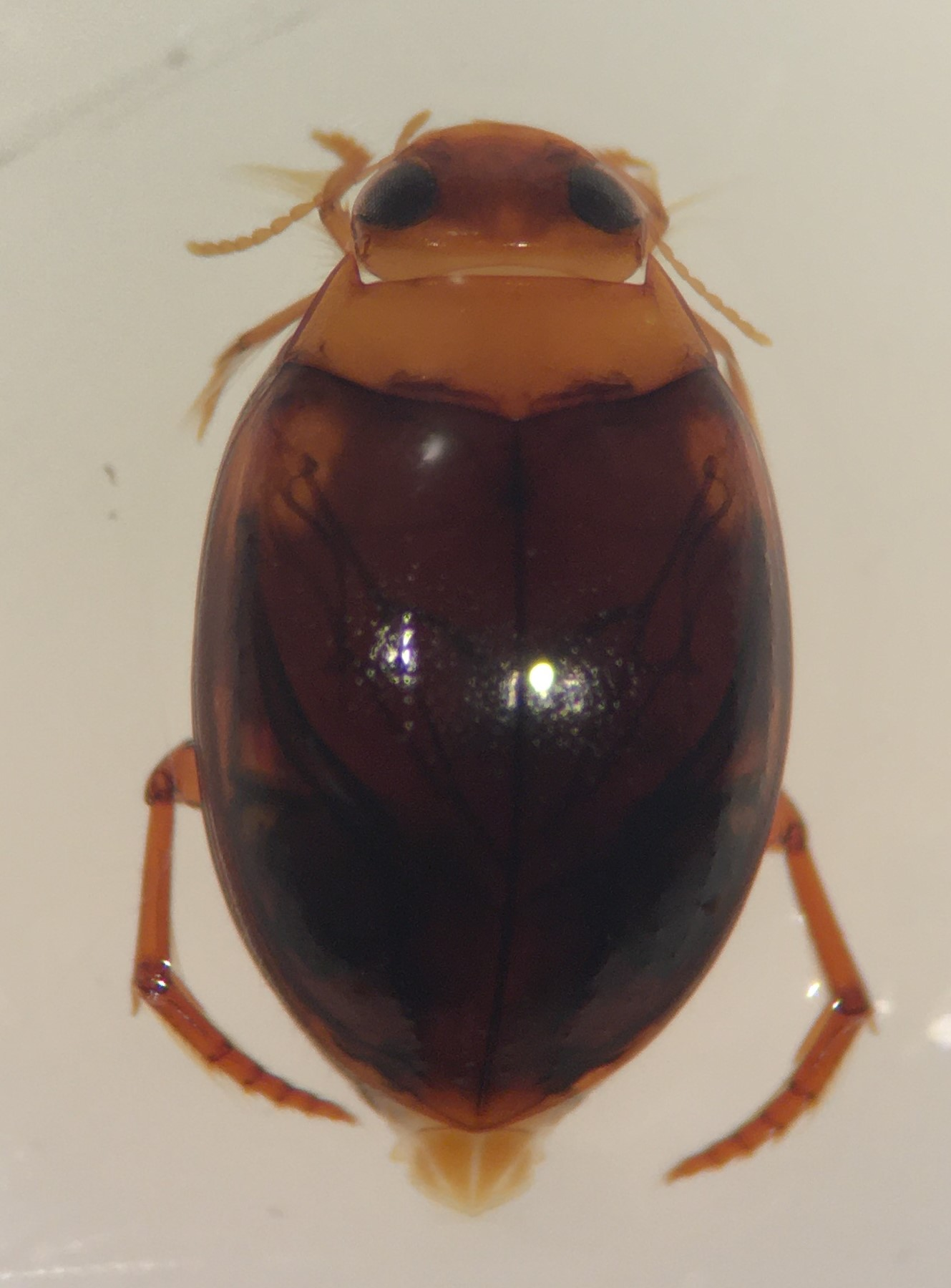
- Pachydrus princeps

Scientific classification
- Kingdom: Animalia
- Phylum: Arthropoda
- Class: Insecta
- Order: Coleoptera
- Suborder: Adephaga
- Family: Dytiscidae
- Tribe: Hyphydrini
- Genus: Pachydrus; Sharp, 1882

= Pachydrus =

Genus of beetles

Pachydrus is a genus of beetles in the family Dytiscidae, containing the following species:

- Pachydrus brevis Sharp, 1882
- Pachydrus cayennensis (Laporte, 1835)
- Pachydrus cribratus Sharp, 1882
- Pachydrus globosus (Aubé, 1838)
- Pachydrus obesus Sharp, 1882
- Pachydrus obniger (Chevrolat, 1863)
- Pachydrus politus Sharp, 1882
- Pachydrus princeps (Blatchley, 1914)
- Pachydrus ritsemae Régimbart, 1883
