= Hydrovatus confertus =

Scientific classification
- Kingdom: Animalia
- Phylum: Arthropoda
- Class: Insecta
- Order: Coleoptera
- Suborder: Adephaga
- Family: Dytiscidae
- Genus: Hydrovatus
- Species: H. confertus

Binomial name
- Hydrovatus confertus Sharp, 1882

Species of beetle

Hydrovatus confertus, is a species of predaceous diving beetle found in India, China, Thailand, Laos, Vietnam, Malaysia, Indonesia, Sri Lanka, Myanmar, Celebes, Cambodia, Hawaii, Bangladesh, Pakistan, and Nepal.
