= Hydrovatus pustulatus =

Scientific classification
- Domain: Eukaryota
- Kingdom: Animalia
- Phylum: Arthropoda
- Class: Insecta
- Order: Coleoptera
- Suborder: Adephaga
- Family: Dytiscidae
- Genus: Hydrovatus
- Species: H. pustulatus

Binomial name
- Hydrovatus pustulatus (F. E. Melsheimer, 1844)

Synonyms
- Hydrovatus indianensis Blatchley, 1910; Hydrovatus pustulatus compressus Sharp, 1882

Species of beetle

Hydrovatus pustulatus is a species of predaceous diving beetle in the family Dytiscidae. It is found in North America.
