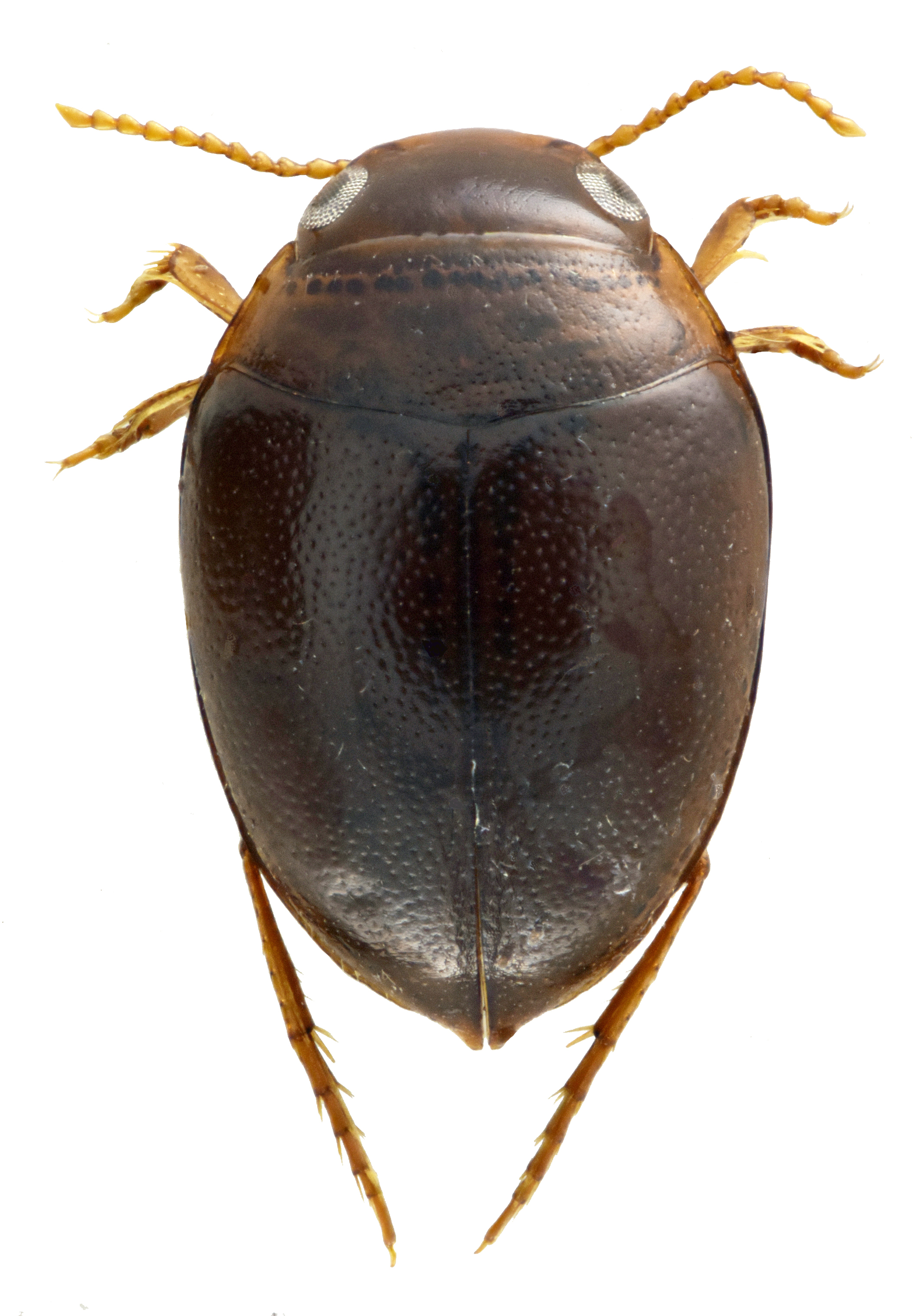

Scientific classification
- Kingdom: Animalia
- Phylum: Arthropoda
- Class: Insecta
- Order: Coleoptera
- Suborder: Adephaga
- Family: Dytiscidae
- Genus: Hydrovatus
- Species: H. sinister

Binomial name
- Hydrovatus sinister Sharp, 1890

= Hydrovatus sinister =

Species of beetle

Hydrovatus sinister, is a species of predaceous diving beetle found in India, Myanmar, Sri Lanka, Sumatra, Thailand, Laos, Singapore and Malaysia.
