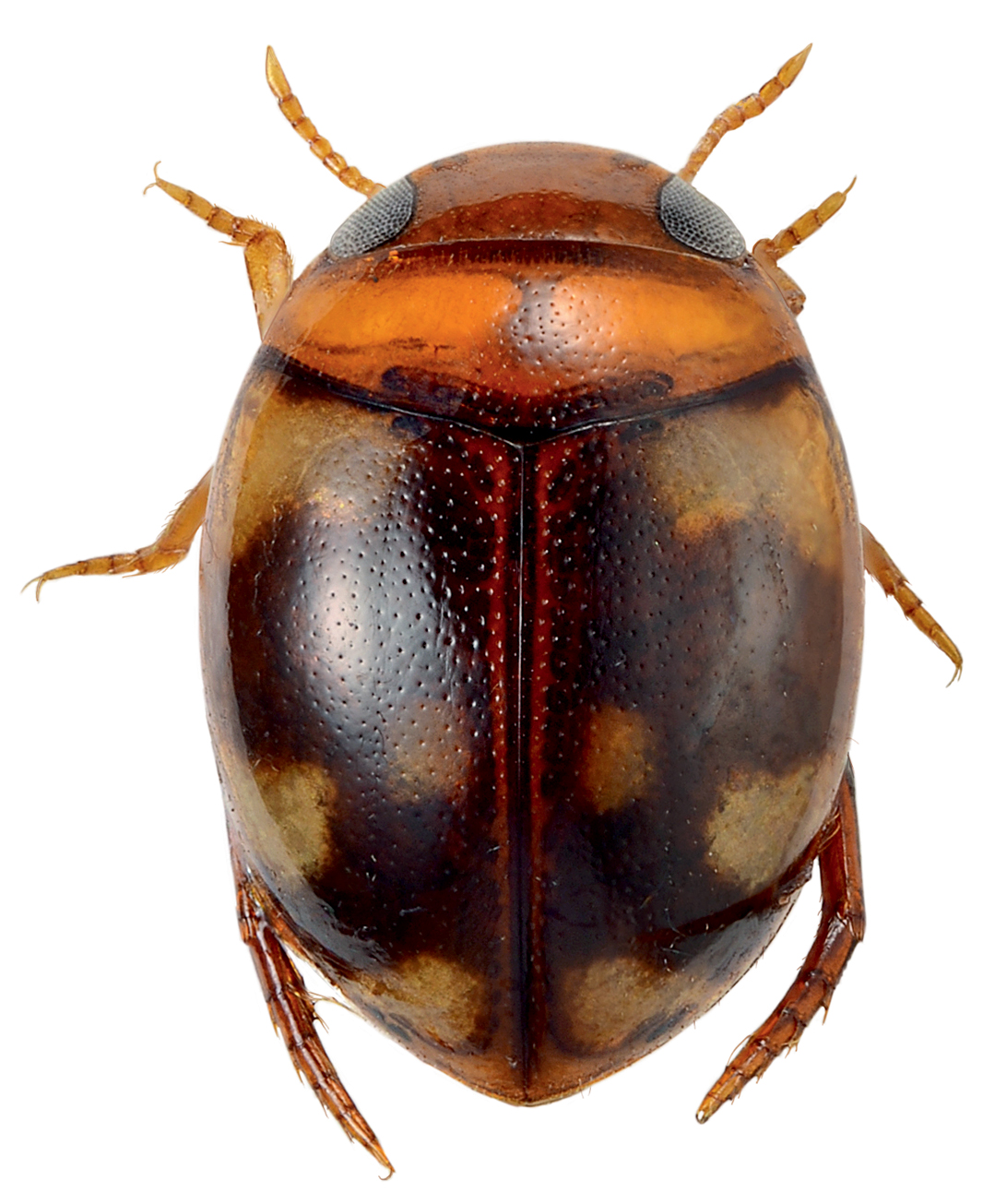

Scientific classification
- Kingdom: Animalia
- Phylum: Arthropoda
- Class: Insecta
- Order: Coleoptera
- Suborder: Adephaga
- Family: Dytiscidae
- Genus: Microdytes
- Species: M. maculatus

Binomial name
- Microdytes maculatus (Motschulsky, 1859)

Synonyms
- Hydrovatus maculatus Motschulsky, 1859; Desmopachria maculatus Gschwendtner 1936; Microdytes maculatus Vazirani 1969

= Microdytes maculatus =

Species of beetle

Microdytes maculatus, is a species of predaceous diving beetle found in India, Thailand, Southern Andaman Islands, Sri Lanka, China, Thailand, Laos and Myanmar.
