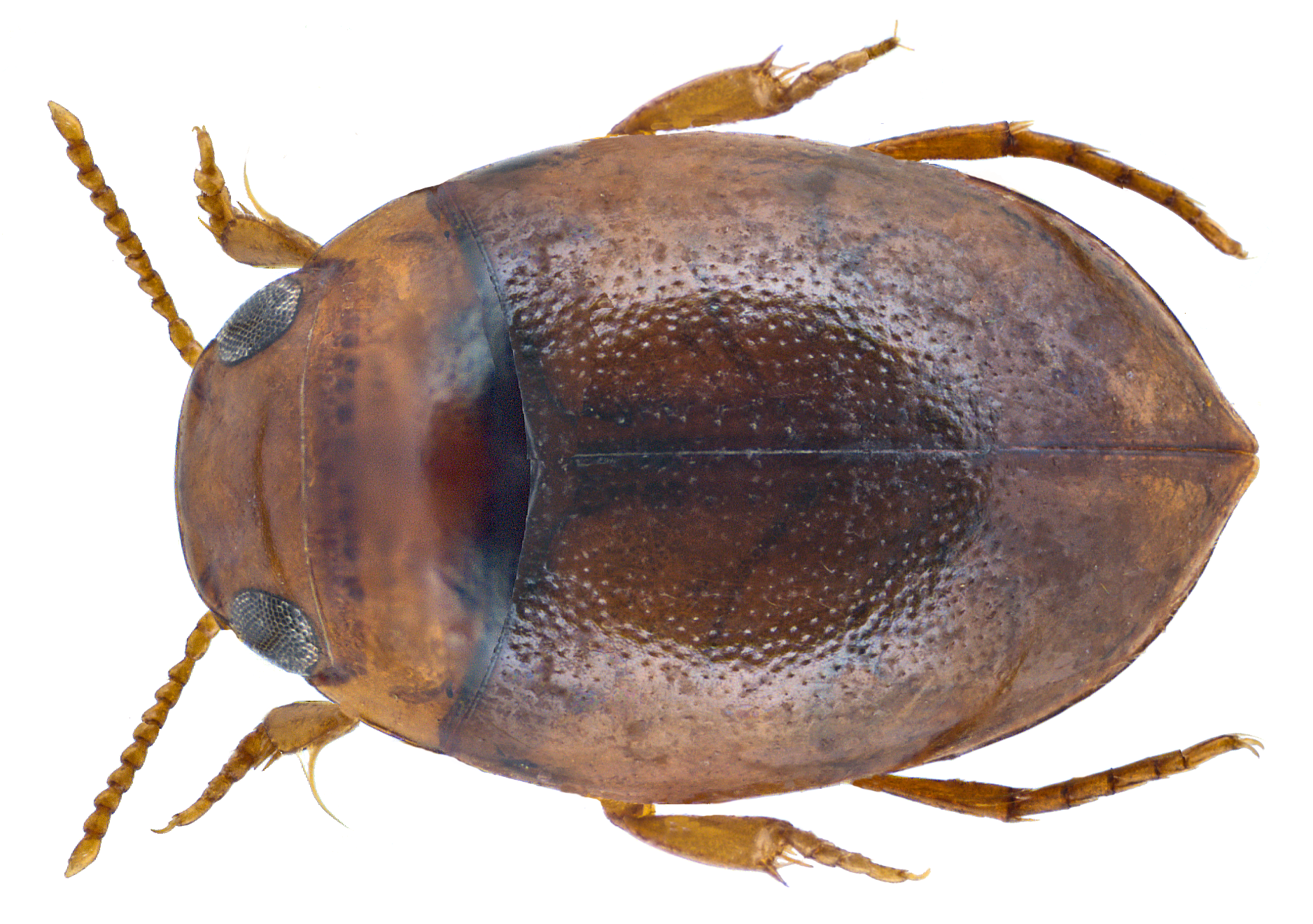

Scientific classification
- Kingdom: Animalia
- Phylum: Arthropoda
- Class: Insecta
- Order: Coleoptera
- Suborder: Adephaga
- Family: Dytiscidae
- Genus: Hydrovatus
- Species: H. seminarius

Binomial name
- Hydrovatus seminarius Motschulsky, 1859

Synonyms
- Hydrovatus fusculus Sharp, 1882; Hydrovatus matsuii Nakane, 1990; Hydrovatus tinctus Sharp, 1882; Hydrovatus (Vathydrus) fusculus Sharp, 1882

= Hydrovatus seminarius =

Species of beetle

Hydrovatus seminarius, is a species of predaceous diving beetle found in India, Bangladesh, Bhutan, Myanmar, Nepal, Pakistan, Sri Lanka, China, Indonesia, Japan, Laos, Malaysia, Taiwan, Thailand, Vietnam and Australian region.

This large species has a typical length of about 2.4 to 2.8 mm.
