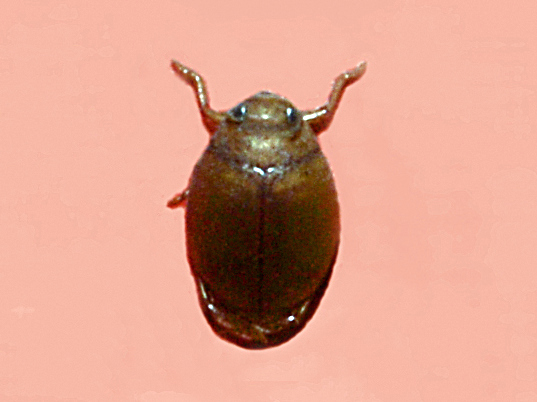
- Hyphydrus ovatus. Museum specimen

Scientific classification
- Kingdom: Animalia
- Phylum: Arthropoda
- Clade: Pancrustacea
- Class: Insecta
- Order: Coleoptera
- Suborder: Adephaga
- Family: Dytiscidae
- Genus: Hyphydrus
- Species: H. ovatus

Binomial name
- Hyphydrus ovatus (Linnaeus, 1761)

Synonyms
- Hyphydrus ferrugineus (Linnaeus, 1767)

= Hyphydrus ovatus =

Species of beetle

Hyphydrus ovatus is a species of diving beetles in the family Dytiscidae.

== Description ==
Hyphydrus ovatus can reach a length of 4.5–5 millimetres (0.18–0.20 in). The body is rust-red, sometimes with indistinct spots. Males have brilliant colors, and the females matt.

== Distribution ==
This species is present in most of Europe, in the East Palearctic ecozone and in the Near East.

== Gallery ==
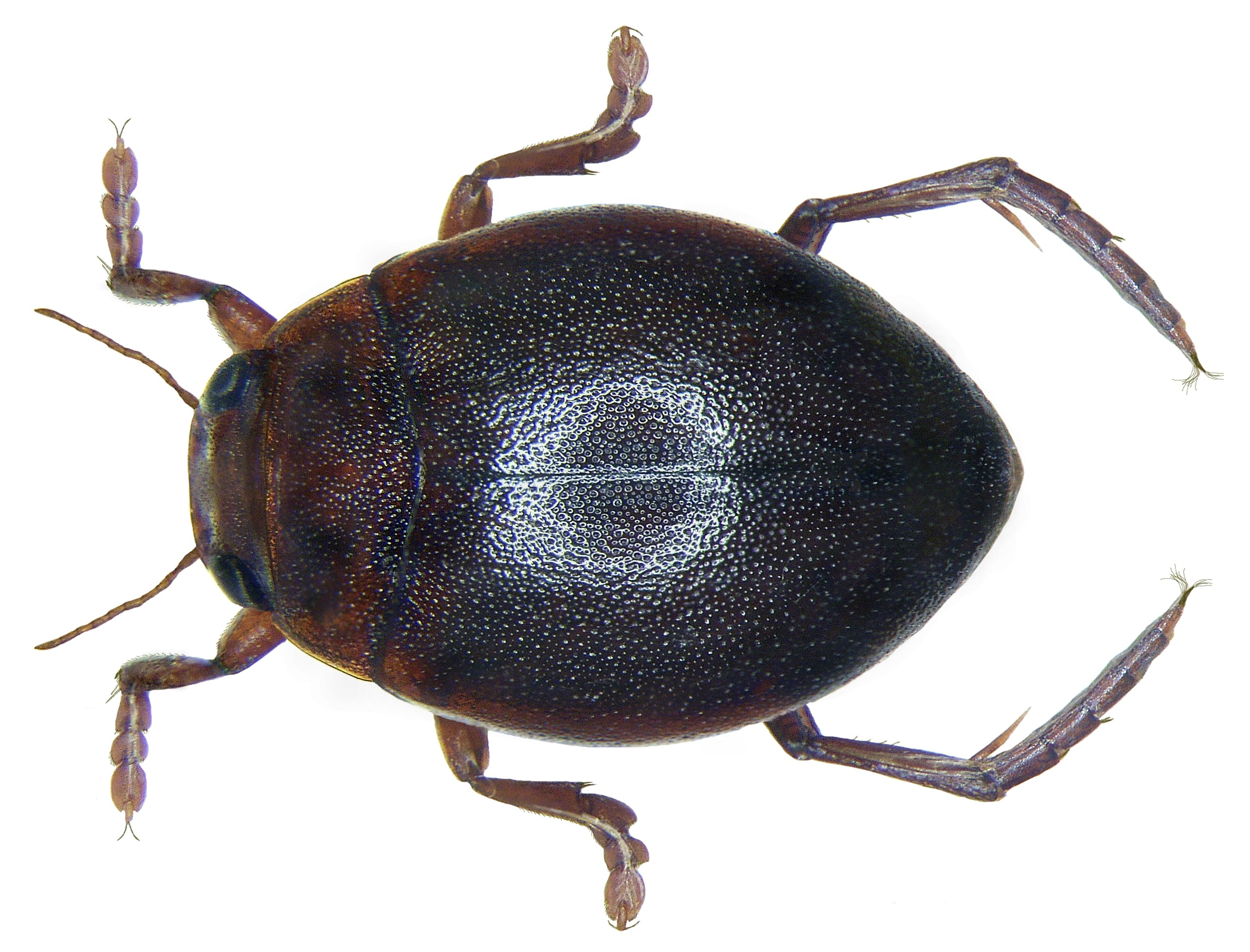
Hyphydrus ovatus

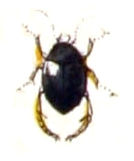
Illustration of Hyphydrus ovatus from Calwer's Käferbuch, Table 8

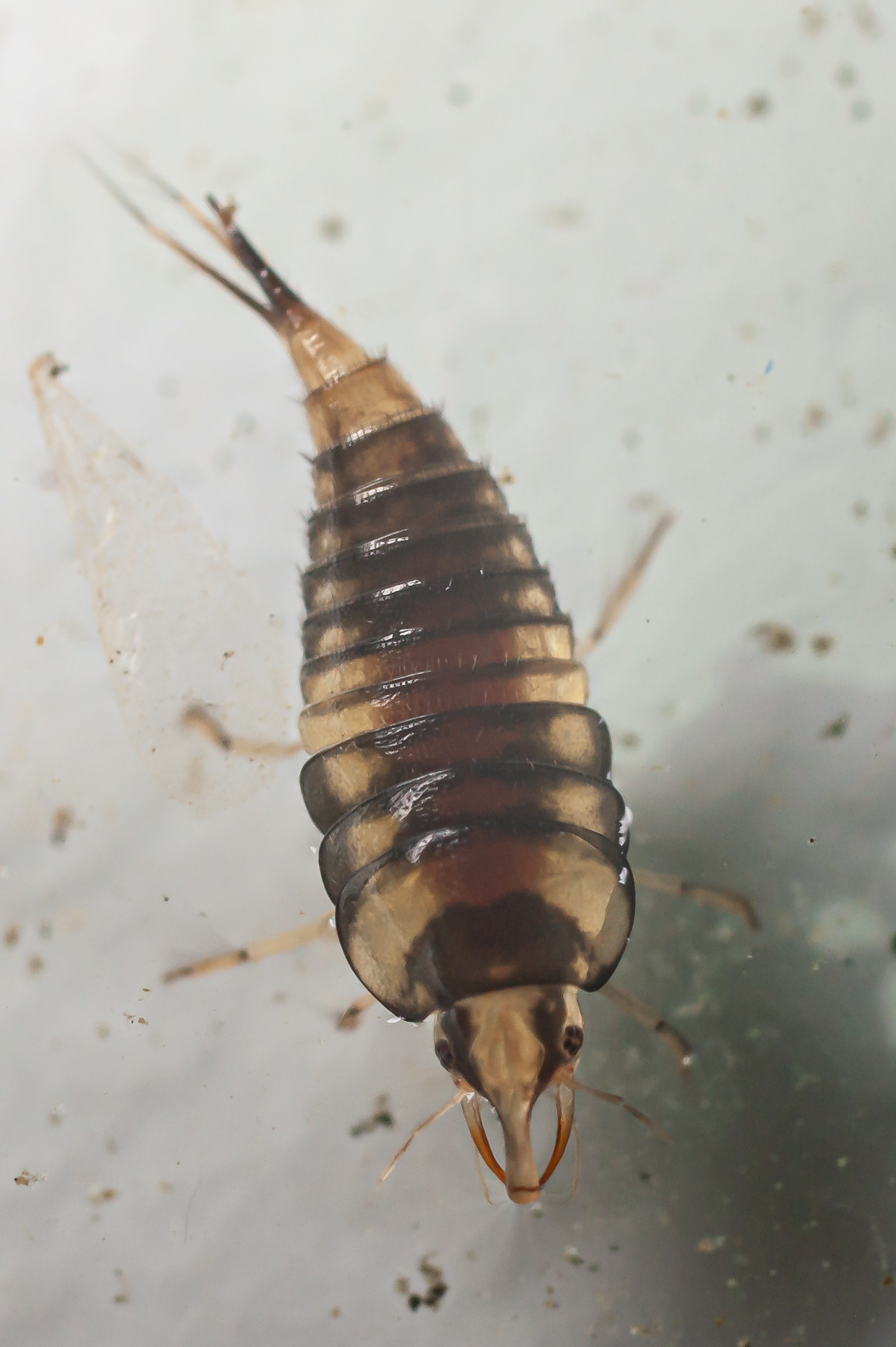
Larva
