= Hyphydrus renardi =

Hydrovatus renardi

Scientific classification
- Kingdom: Animalia
- Phylum: Arthropoda
- Class: Insecta
- Order: Coleoptera
- Suborder: Adephaga
- Family: Dytiscidae
- Genus: Hydrovatus
- Species: H. renardi

Binomial name
- Hydrovatus renardi Severin, 1890

Synonyms
- Hyphydrus (Apriophorus) renardi Severin, 1890; Hyphydrus (Apriophorus) renardi Vazirani, 1977

Species of beetle

Hydrovatus renardi, is a species of predaceous diving beetle widespread in India, Bangladesh, Bhutan, Myanmar, Nepal, Pakistan, and Sri Lanka.
