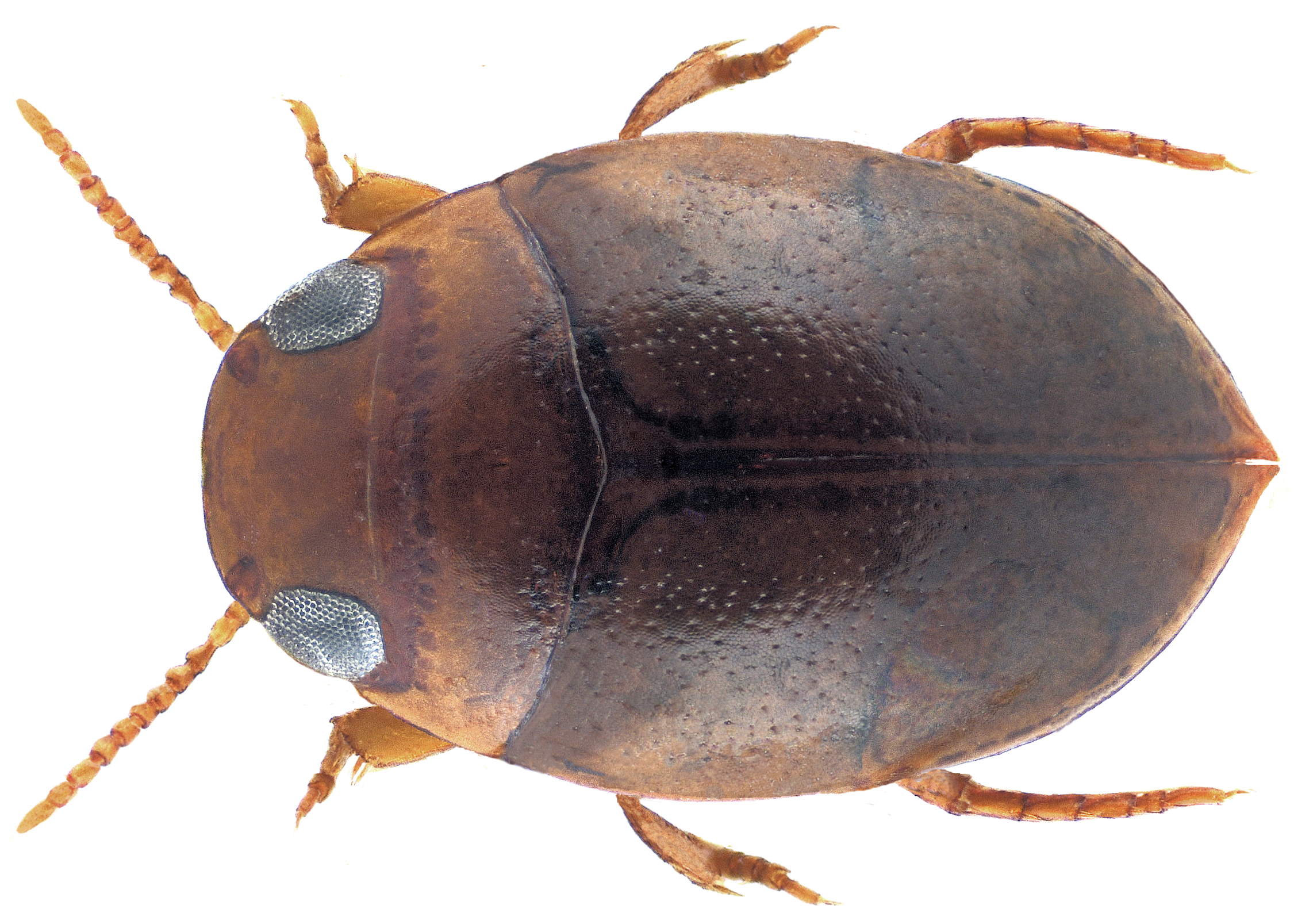

Scientific classification
- Kingdom: Animalia
- Phylum: Arthropoda
- Clade: Pancrustacea
- Class: Insecta
- Order: Coleoptera
- Suborder: Adephaga
- Family: Dytiscidae
- Genus: Hydrovatus
- Species: H. acuminatus

Binomial name
- Hydrovatus acuminatus Motschulsky, 1859

Synonyms
- Hydroporus badius Clark, 1863; Hydroporus malaccae Clark, 1863; Hydrovatus affinis Régimbart, 1895; Hydrovatus consanguineus Régimbart, 1880; Hydrovatus ferrugineus Zimmermann, 1919; Hydrovatus furvus Guignot, 1950; Hydrovatus humilis Sharp, 1882; Hydrovatus obscurus Régimbart, 1895; Hydrovatus obscurus Motschulsky, 1859; Hydrovatus sordidus Sharp, 1882

= Hydrovatus acuminatus =

Species of beetle

Hydrovatus acuminatus, is a species of predaceous diving beetle found in Oriental and African regions.

== Distribution ==
It is found in many countries including; India, Sri Lanka, Indonesia, Myanmar, Turkey, Iran, Iraq, Saudi Arabia, Egypt, Gambia, Sudan, Ethiopia, Nigeria, Ghana, Malawi, Tanzania, Namibia, Mozambique, South Africa, Madagascar, Seychelles, China, Japan, Taiwan, Thailand, Cambodia, Vietnam, Malaysia, Singapore, Philippines, and Micronesia.

== Description ==
Body length is about 2.3 mm. Clypeus without raised front-margin. Both dorsum and ventrum are yellowish brown. Pronotum and wing-case are sparingly and finely punctate.
