= Dimitshydrus =

Scientific classification
- Domain: Eukaryota
- Kingdom: Animalia
- Phylum: Arthropoda
- Class: Insecta
- Order: Coleoptera
- Suborder: Adephaga
- Family: Dytiscidae
- Subfamily: Hydroporinae
- Tribe: Hyphydrini
- Genus: Dimitshydrus; Uéno, 1996
- Species: D. typhlops

Binomial name
- Dimitshydrus typhlops Uéno, 1996

Genus of beetles

Dimitshydrus is a genus of predaceous diving beetles in the family Dytiscidae. This genus has a single species, Dimitshydrus typhlops. It is found in southern Asia.
