= Hydrovatus subrotundatus =

Scientific classification
- Kingdom: Animalia
- Phylum: Arthropoda
- Class: Insecta
- Order: Coleoptera
- Suborder: Adephaga
- Family: Dytiscidae
- Genus: Hydrovatus
- Species: H. subrotundatus

Binomial name
- Hydrovatus subrotundatus Motschulsky, 1859

Synonyms
- Hydroporus carbonarius Clark, 1863; Hydroporus carbonarius var. fuscobrunneus Clark, 1863; Hydrovatus elevatus Sharp, 1882; Hydrovatus ferrugatus Régimbart, 1877; Hydrovatus javanus Csiki, 1938; Hydrovatus orientalis Sharp, 1882; Hydrovatus japonicus Takizawa, 1933

Species of beetle

Hydrovatus subrotundatus, is a species of predaceous diving beetle found in India, Bangladesh, Myanmar, Nepal, Sri Lanka, China, Indonesia, Laos, Philippines, Singapore, Thailand, Vietnam and Australian region.
