= Hydrovatus subtilis =

Scientific classification
- Kingdom: Animalia
- Phylum: Arthropoda
- Class: Insecta
- Order: Coleoptera
- Suborder: Adephaga
- Family: Dytiscidae
- Genus: Hydrovatus
- Species: H. subtilis

Binomial name
- Hydrovatus subtilis Sharp, 1882

Synonyms
- Hydrovatus adachii Kamiya, 1932

Species of beetle

Hydrovatus subtilis, is a species of predaceous diving beetle found in India, Andaman & Nicobar Islands, Sri Lanka, Indonesia, Japan, Laos, Malaysia, and Thailand.

Body larger with a typical length of about 2.4 to 2.8 mm.
