= Darwinhydrus =

Scientific classification
- Kingdom: Animalia
- Phylum: Arthropoda
- Class: Insecta
- Order: Coleoptera
- Suborder: Adephaga
- Family: Dytiscidae
- Tribe: Hyphydrini
- Genus: Darwinhydrus; Sharp, 1882
- Species: D. solidus

Binomial name
- Darwinhydrus solidus Sharp, 1882

Genus of beetles

Darwinhydrus is a genus of predaceous diving beetles in the family Dytiscidae. This genus has a single species, Darwinhydrus solidus, found in South Africa.
