= Hydrovatus rufoniger =

Scientific classification
- Kingdom: Animalia
- Phylum: Arthropoda
- Class: Insecta
- Order: Coleoptera
- Suborder: Adephaga
- Family: Dytiscidae
- Genus: Hydrovatus
- Species: H. rufoniger

Binomial name
- Hydrovatus rufoniger (Clark, 1863)

Synonyms
- Hydrovatus atricolor Régimbart, 1880

Species of beetle

Hydrovatus rufoniger, is a species of predaceous diving beetle found in India, Bangladesh, Myanmar, Sri Lanka, China, Sumatra, Malaysia, Singapore, Thailand, Vietnam and Australian region.

== Subspecies ==
Two subspecies have been identified.

- Hydrovatus rufoniger politus Sharp, 1882
- Hydrovatus rufoniger rufoniger (Clark, 1863)
