= Hydrovatus castaneus =

Scientific classification
- Kingdom: Animalia
- Phylum: Arthropoda
- Class: Insecta
- Order: Coleoptera
- Suborder: Adephaga
- Family: Dytiscidae
- Genus: Hydrovatus
- Species: H. castaneus

Binomial name
- Hydrovatus castaneus Motschulsky, 1855

Species of beetle

Hydrovatus castaneus, is a species of predaceous diving beetle found in India, Myanmar, Indonesia, Sri Lanka, Bangladesh, and China.
