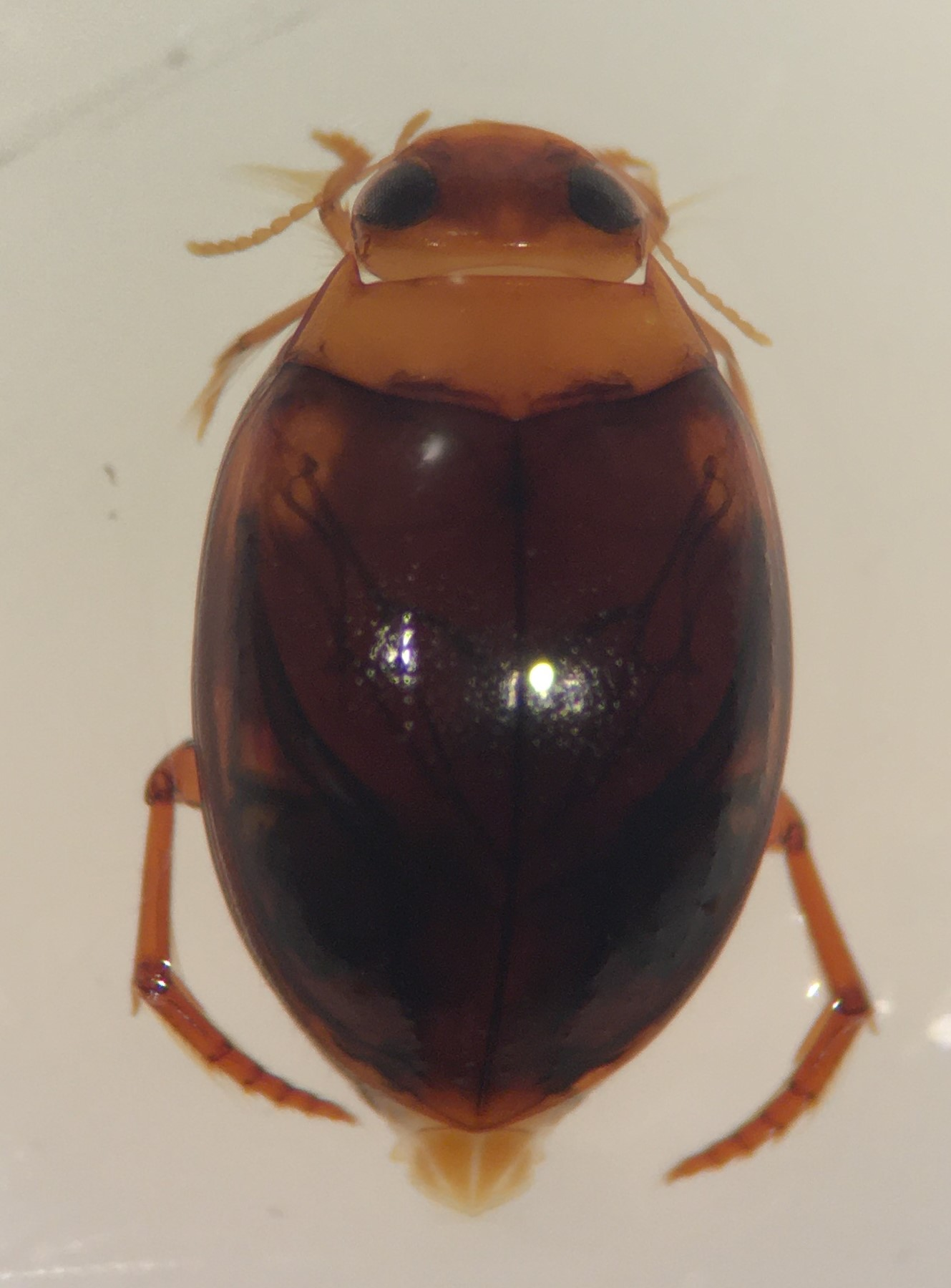

Scientific classification
- Domain: Eukaryota
- Kingdom: Animalia
- Phylum: Arthropoda
- Class: Insecta
- Order: Coleoptera
- Suborder: Adephaga
- Family: Dytiscidae
- Genus: Pachydrus
- Species: P. princeps

Binomial name
- Pachydrus princeps (Blatchley, 1914)

= Pachydrus princeps =

Species of beetle

Pachydrus princeps is a species of predaceous diving beetle in the family Dytiscidae. It is found in North America and the Neotropics.

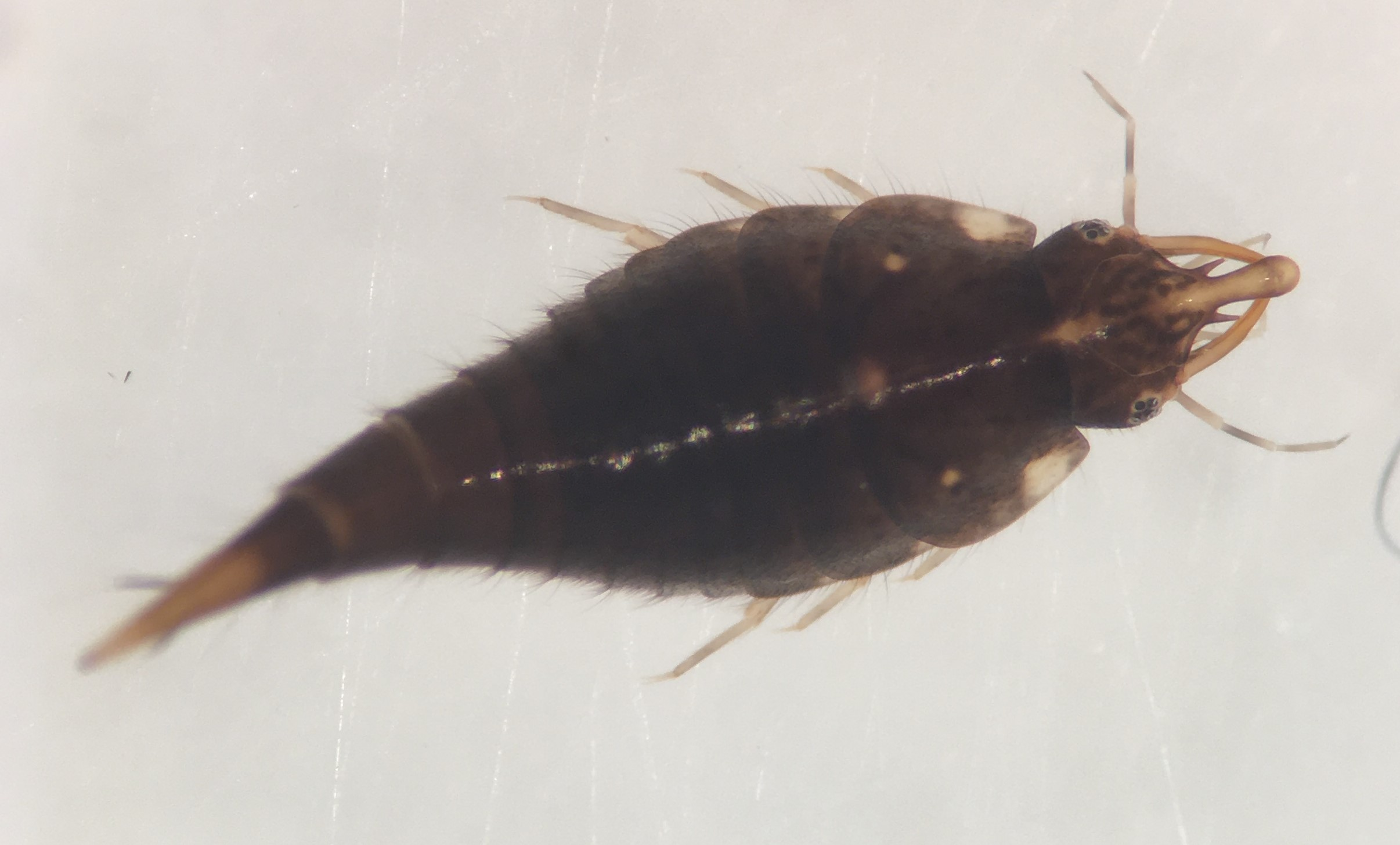
Larva
