= Hyphydrus lyratus =

Hydrovatus lyratus

Scientific classification
- Kingdom: Animalia
- Phylum: Arthropoda
- Class: Insecta
- Order: Coleoptera
- Suborder: Adephaga
- Family: Dytiscidae
- Genus: Hydrovatus
- Species: H. lyratus

Binomial name
- Hydrovatus lyratus Sharp, 1882

Synonyms
- Hyphydrus (Apriophorus) flavicans Régimbart, 1892; Hyphydrus (Apriophorus) lyratus flavicans Regimbert, 1892; Hyphydrus flavicans Régimbart, 1892; Hyphydrus bisulcatus Clark, 1863; Hydroporus fossulipennis W.J.Macleay, 1871; Hyphydrus nigronotatus Clark, 1863

Species of beetle

Hydrovatus lyratus, is a species of predaceous diving beetle widespread in South Asia, South East Asia and Australian region.

== Subspecies ==
Four subspecies have been identified.

- Hyphydrus lyratus flavicans Régimbart, 1892 - India, Pakistan, Sri Lanka
- Hyphydrus lyratus foveolatus Régimbart, 1892 - Papua New Guinea
- Hyphydrus lyratus lyratus Swartz, 1808 - India, Andaman & Nicobar Islands, Myanmar, Sri Lanka; China, Indonesia, Japan, Taiwan, Thailand, Vietnam; Australian region.
- Hyphydrus lyratus xanthomelas Régimbart, 1877 - Malaysia

== Biology ==
Third instar has a fusiformate body with elongated frontoclypeus. Lateral notches are absent and gular sutures are fused. Siphon elongated, acute apically, with secondary spines. Head length is 1.03 to 1.29 mm. Cephalic capsule pear-shaped, and tapering posteriorly. Cephalic capsule is mainly creamy white to pale yellow i color dorsally, with a longitudinal brownish stripe laterally. Antenna with four-segments, and slightly shorter than head capsule. Mandibles are falciform, and narrow. Pronotum trapezoidal dorsally, and ovate laterally. Pronotum creamy white to pale yellow. Legs are with five segments and pale yellow to pale brown in color. Abdomen consists with eight segments.

Adult beetle has longer smooth-edged metatibial spine. The second sternite of male has a sharp, backwardly projecting process. In female, disc of elytron has a distinct, longitudinal groove. Protarsi and mesotarsi are similarly expanded. Ventrite 2 consists with a midline large spine. Elytron lacks a macula.
