= Primospes =

Scientific classification
- Kingdom: Animalia
- Phylum: Arthropoda
- Class: Insecta
- Order: Coleoptera
- Suborder: Adephaga
- Family: Dytiscidae
- Tribe: Hyphydrini
- Genus: Primospes; Sharp, 1882
- Species: P. suturalis

Binomial name
- Primospes suturalis Sharp, 1882

Genus of beetles

Primospes is a genus of predaceous diving beetles in the family Dytiscidae. This genus has a single species, Primospes suturalis, found in Africa.
