= Hydrovatus peninsularis =

Scientific classification
- Domain: Eukaryota
- Kingdom: Animalia
- Phylum: Arthropoda
- Class: Insecta
- Order: Coleoptera
- Suborder: Adephaga
- Family: Dytiscidae
- Genus: Hydrovatus
- Species: H. peninsularis

Binomial name
- Hydrovatus peninsularis Young, 1953

Species of beetle

Hydrovatus peninsularis is a species of predaceous diving beetle in the family Dytiscidae. It is found in North America.
