= Hydrovatus picipennis =

Scientific classification
- Kingdom: Animalia
- Phylum: Arthropoda
- Class: Insecta
- Order: Coleoptera
- Suborder: Adephaga
- Family: Dytiscidae
- Genus: Hydrovatus
- Species: H. picipennis

Binomial name
- Hydrovatus picipennis Motschulsky, 1859

Species of beetle

Hydrovatus picipennis, is a species of predaceous diving beetle found in India, Sri Lanka, Indonesia, Philippines, China and Thailand.

Body elongated with a typical length of about 3.0 and 4.2 mm and the apex of elytra is distinct. Penis apex is broad, which narrows abruptly to a slender tip. In male, the ridges of stridulatory file is larger, and clearly discernible. Male protarsal claws are not distinctly thickened.
