= Hyphydrus intermixtus =

Scientific classification
- Kingdom: Animalia
- Phylum: Arthropoda
- Class: Insecta
- Order: Coleoptera
- Suborder: Adephaga
- Family: Dytiscidae
- Genus: Hydaticus
- Species: H. intermixtus

Binomial name
- Hydaticus intermixtus (Walker, 1858)

Synonyms
- Hydroporus intermixtus Walker, 1858; Hyphydrus indicus Sharp, 1882

Species of beetle

Hyphydrus intermixtus, is a species of predaceous diving beetle found in India and Sri Lanka.
