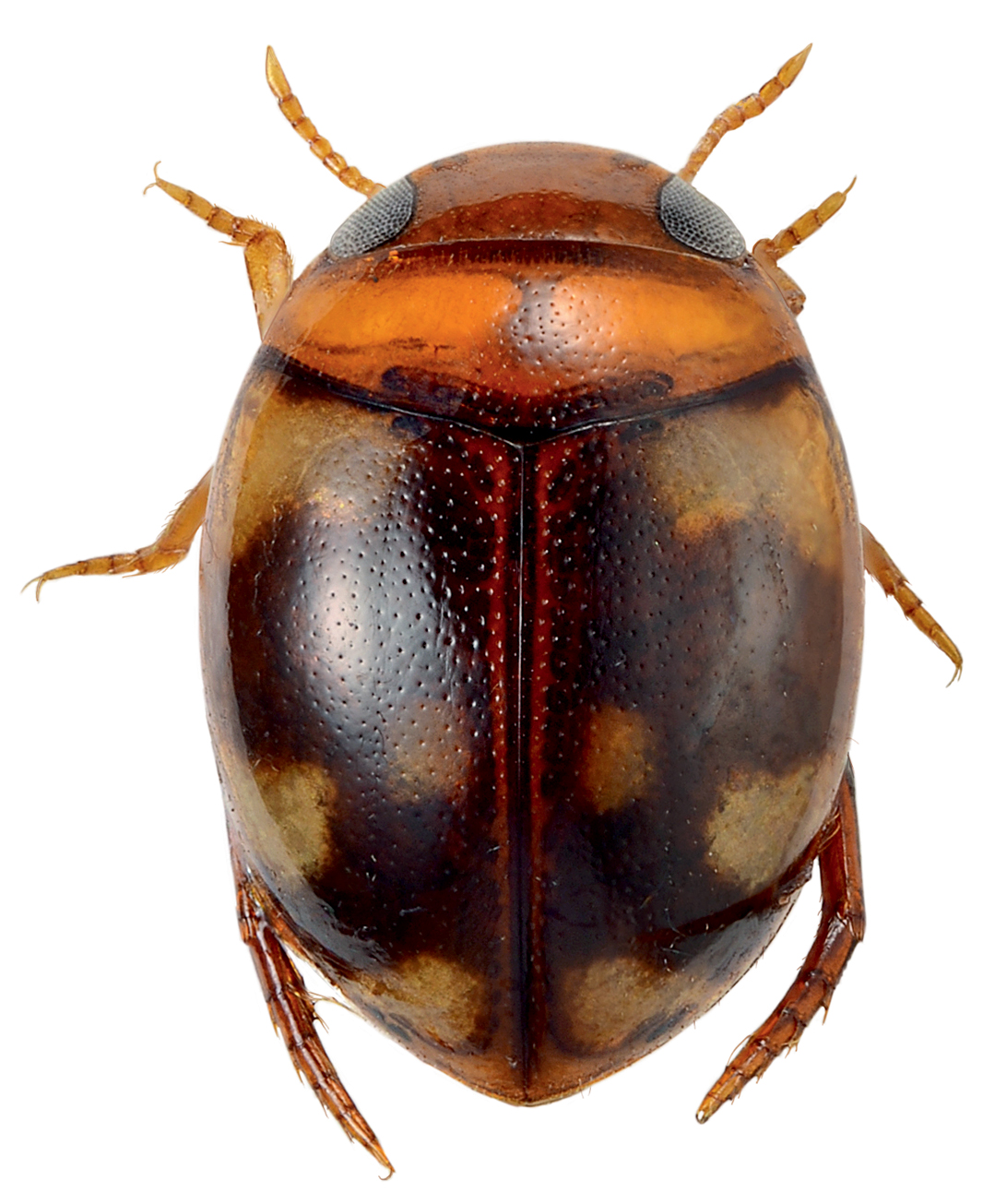
- Dorsal habitus of Microdytes maculatus

Scientific classification
- Kingdom: Animalia
- Phylum: Arthropoda
- Clade: Pancrustacea
- Class: Insecta
- Order: Coleoptera
- Suborder: Adephaga
- Family: Dytiscidae
- Genus: Microdytes; J.Balfour-Browne, 1946

= Microdytes =

Genus of beetles

Microdytes is a genus of beetles in the family Dytiscidae, containing the following species:

- Microdytes akitai Wewalka, 1997
- Microdytes balkei Wewalka, 1997
- Microdytes belli J.Balfour-Browne, 1946
- Microdytes bistroemi Wewalka, 1997
- Microdytes boukali Wewalka, 1997
- Microdytes championi J.Balfour-Browne, 1946
- Microdytes dimorphus Wewalka, 1997
- Microdytes elgae Hendrich, Balke & Wewalka, 1995
- Microdytes franzi Wewalka & Wang, 1998
- Microdytes gabrielae Wewalka, 1997
- Microdytes hainanensis Wewalka, 1997
- Microdytes hendrichi Wewalka, 1997
- Microdytes holzmannorum Wewalka & Wang, 1998
- Microdytes jaechi Wewalka, 1997
- Microdytes lotteae Wewalka, 1998
- Microdytes maculatus (Motschulsky, 1859)
- Microdytes mariannae Wewalka, 1997
- Microdytes mazzoldii Wewalka & Wang, 1998
- Microdytes menopausis Wewalka, 1997
- Microdytes nilssoni Wewalka, 1997
- Microdytes pasiricus (Csiki, 1938)
- Microdytes sabitae Vazirani, 1968
- Microdytes sarawakensis Wewalka, 1997
- Microdytes satoi Wewalka, 1997
- Microdytes schoedli Wewalka, 1997
- Microdytes schoenmanni Wewalka, 1997
- Microdytes schuhi Wewalka, 1997
- Microdytes schwendingeri Wewalka, 1997
- Microdytes shepardi Wewalka, 1997
- Microdytes shunichii Satô, 1995
- Microdytes sinensis Wewalka, 1997
- Microdytes tomokunii Satô, 1981
- Microdytes uenoi Satô, 1972
- Microdytes zetteli Wewalka, 1997
