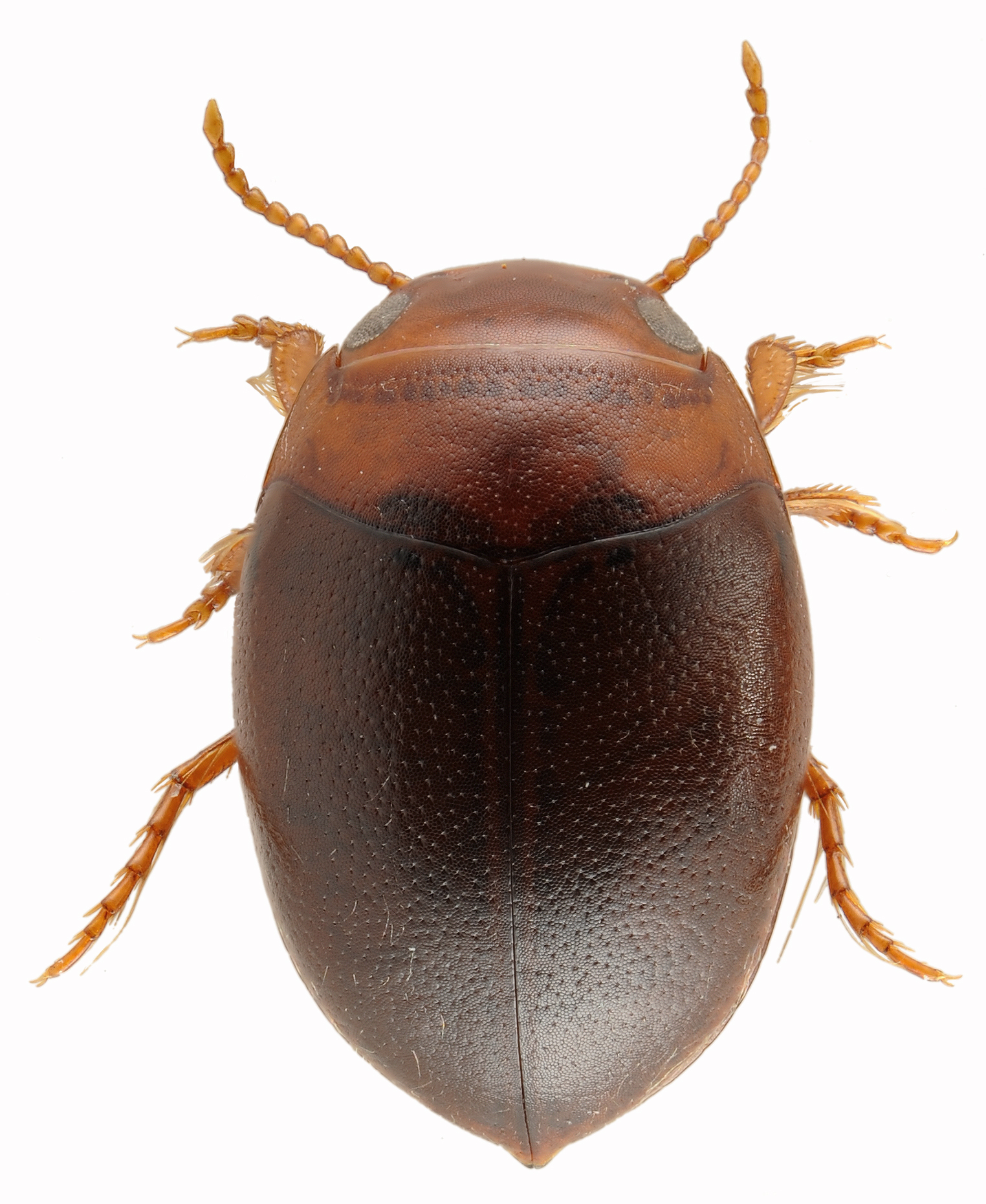
- Hydrovatus opacus

Scientific classification
- Kingdom: Animalia
- Phylum: Arthropoda
- Class: Insecta
- Order: Coleoptera
- Suborder: Adephaga
- Family: Dytiscidae
- Subfamily: Hydroporinae
- Genus: Hydrovatus; Motschulsky, 1853

= Hydrovatus =

Genus of beetles

Hydrovatus is a genus of water beetles in the family Dytiscidae, containing the following species:

- Hydrovatus abraeoides Régimbart, 1895
- Hydrovatus absonus Guignot, 1948
- Hydrovatus acuminatus Motschulsky, 1859
- Hydrovatus agathodaemon Biström, 1997
- Hydrovatus amplicornis Régimbart, 1895
- Hydrovatus angusticornis Biström, 1997
- Hydrovatus antennatus (Peschet, 1924)
- Hydrovatus aristidis Leprieur, 1879
- Hydrovatus asemus Biström, 1997
- Hydrovatus asymmetricus Biström & Wewalka, 1994
- Hydrovatus badeni Sharp, 1882
- Hydrovatus balfourbrownei Biström, 1997
- Hydrovatus balneator Guignot, 1954
- Hydrovatus baptus Guignot, 1954
- Hydrovatus bedoanus Bruneau de Miré & Legros, 1963
- Hydrovatus bicolor Guignot, 1956
- Hydrovatus bomansi Guignot, 1955
- Hydrovatus bonvouloiri Sharp, 1882
- Hydrovatus brancuccii Biström, 1997
- Hydrovatus bredoi Gschwendtner, 1943
- Hydrovatus brevipes Sharp, 1882
- Hydrovatus brevipilis Guignot, 1942
- Hydrovatus brownei Omer-Cooper, 1955
- Hydrovatus brunneus Guignot, 1961
- Hydrovatus bullatus Guignot, 1958
- Hydrovatus capnius Guignot, 1950
- Hydrovatus caraibus Sharp, 1882
- Hydrovatus cardoni Severin, 1890
- Hydrovatus castaneus Motschulsky, 1855
- Hydrovatus cessatus Guignot, 1956
- Hydrovatus charactes Guignot, 1955
- Hydrovatus clypealis Sharp, 1876
- Hydrovatus collega Guignot, 1955
- Hydrovatus compactus Sharp, 1882
- Hydrovatus concii Bilardo & Pederzani, 1978
- Hydrovatus concolor Sharp, 1887
- Hydrovatus confertus Sharp, 1882
- Hydrovatus confossus Guignot, 1958
- Hydrovatus confusus Régimbart, 1903
- Hydrovatus contumax Guignot, 1954
- Hydrovatus coracinus Guignot, 1947
- Hydrovatus crassicornis (H.J.Kolbe, 1883)
- Hydrovatus crassulus Sharp, 1882
- Hydrovatus cribratus Sharp, 1882
- Hydrovatus cristatus Guignot, 1958
- Hydrovatus cruentatus H.J.Kolbe, 1883
- Hydrovatus cuspidatus (Kunze, 1818)
- Hydrovatus dama Guignot, 1958
- Hydrovatus davidis Young, 1956
- Hydrovatus dentatus Bilardo & Rocchi, 1990
- Hydrovatus deserticola Guignot, 1950
- Hydrovatus diabolicus Biström & Larson, 1995
- Hydrovatus difformis Régimbart, 1895
- Hydrovatus duponti Régimbart, 1895
- Hydrovatus enigmaticus Biström, 1997
- Hydrovatus eximius Biström, 1997
- Hydrovatus exochomoides Régimbart, 1895
- Hydrovatus facetus Guignot, 1942
- Hydrovatus fasciatus Sharp, 1882
- Hydrovatus felixi Biström, 1997
- Hydrovatus fernandoi Biström, 1997
- Hydrovatus ferrugineus Zimmermann, 1920
- Hydrovatus flammulatus Sharp, 1882
- Hydrovatus flebilis Guignot, 1945
- Hydrovatus fractus Sharp, 1882
- Hydrovatus frater Régimbart, 1895
- Hydrovatus fulvicollis Guignot, 1958
- Hydrovatus gabonicus Régimbart, 1895
- Hydrovatus galpini Omer-Cooper, 1957
- Hydrovatus glaber Guignot, 1953
- Hydrovatus globulosus Gschwendtner, 1943
- Hydrovatus grabowskyi Régimbart, 1899
- Hydrovatus granosus Guignot, 1958
- Hydrovatus gravis Guignot, 1954
- Hydrovatus guignoti Omer-Cooper, 1957
- Hydrovatus guignotianus Guignot, 1959
- Hydrovatus hamatus Guignot, 1950
- Hydrovatus heterogynus Zimmermann, 1926
- Hydrovatus hintoni Biström, 1997
- Hydrovatus hornii Crotch, 1873
- Hydrovatus imitator Biström, 1997
- Hydrovatus impunctatus Guignot, 1953
- Hydrovatus inexpectatus Young, 1963
- Hydrovatus insolitus Guignot, 1948
- Hydrovatus irianensis Biström, 1997
- Hydrovatus jaechi Biström, 1997
- Hydrovatus kavanaughi Biström, 1997
- Hydrovatus laosensis Biström, 1997
- Hydrovatus latipalpis Biström, 1997
- Hydrovatus leconteii (Clark, 1862)
- Hydrovatus leonardii Bilardo & Pederzani, 1978
- Hydrovatus lintrarius Guignot, 1958
- Hydrovatus longicornis Sharp, 1882
- Hydrovatus longior Biström, 1997
- Hydrovatus maai Biström, 1997
- Hydrovatus macrocephalus Gschwendtner, 1934
- Hydrovatus macrocerus Régimbart, 1895
- Hydrovatus madagascariensis Régimbart, 1903
- Hydrovatus marlieri Guignot, 1956
- Hydrovatus medialis J.Balfour-Browne, 1939
- Hydrovatus megalocerus Bilardo & Pederzani, 1978
- Hydrovatus mollis Biström, 1997
- Hydrovatus mucronatus Régimbart, 1908
- Hydrovatus mundus Omer-Cooper, 1931
- Hydrovatus naviger Biström, 1997
- Hydrovatus nefandus Omer-Cooper, 1957
- Hydrovatus nephodes Guignot, 1953
- Hydrovatus ngorekiensis Bilardo & Rocchi, 1999
- Hydrovatus niger Gschwendtner, 1938
- Hydrovatus nigricans Sharp, 1882
- Hydrovatus nigrita Sharp, 1882
- Hydrovatus nilssoni Biström, 1997
- Hydrovatus nimbaensis Guignot, 1954
- Hydrovatus niokolensis Guignot, 1956
- Hydrovatus noumeni Bilardo & Rocchi, 1990
- Hydrovatus oblongipennis Régimbart, 1895
- Hydrovatus oblongiusculus Régimbart, 1895
- Hydrovatus oblongus Omer-Cooper, 1957
- Hydrovatus obsoletus Peschet, 1922
- Hydrovatus obtusus Motschulsky, 1855
- Hydrovatus omentatus Guignot, 1950
- Hydrovatus opacus Sharp, 1882
- Hydrovatus otiosus Guignot, 1945
- Hydrovatus ovalis Sharp, 1882
- Hydrovatus parallelipennis Régimbart, 1895
- Hydrovatus parallelus Sharp, 1882
- Hydrovatus parameces Guignot, 1958
- Hydrovatus parvulus Régimbart, 1900
- Hydrovatus pederzanii Bilardo & Rocchi, 1990
- Hydrovatus peninsularis Young, 1953
- Hydrovatus perrinae Bilardo & Pederzani, 1978
- Hydrovatus perssoni Biström & Nilsson, 1997
- Hydrovatus pescheti Omer-Cooper, 1931
- Hydrovatus piceus Guignot, 1961
- Hydrovatus picipennis Motschulsky, 1859
- Hydrovatus pictulus Sharp, 1882
- Hydrovatus pilitibiis Omer-Cooper, 1957
- Hydrovatus pilula Guignot, 1954
- Hydrovatus pinguis Régimbart, 1892
- Hydrovatus pisiformis Biström, 1997
- Hydrovatus platycornis Young, 1963
- Hydrovatus postremus Guignot, 1942
- Hydrovatus pudicus (Clark, 1863)
- Hydrovatus pulcher Gschwendtner, 1934
- Hydrovatus pumilus Sharp, 1882
- Hydrovatus punctipennis Motschulsky, 1859
- Hydrovatus pustulatus (F.E.Melsheimer, 1844)
- Hydrovatus pyrrus Guignot, 1958
- Hydrovatus rangoonensis Guignot, 1954
- Hydrovatus reclusus Guignot, 1955
- Hydrovatus regimbarti Zimmermann, 1919
- Hydrovatus reticuliceps Régimbart, 1895
- Hydrovatus rocchii Biström, 1997
- Hydrovatus rufescens Motschulsky, 1859
- Hydrovatus rufoniger (Clark, 1863)
- Hydrovatus samuelsoni Biström, 1997
- Hydrovatus sandwichensis Biström, 1995
- Hydrovatus sanfilippoi Bilardo & Rocchi, 1990
- Hydrovatus satanas Guignot, 1958
- Hydrovatus satanoides Pederzani & Rocchi, 1982
- Hydrovatus saundersi Biström, 1997
- Hydrovatus schawalleri Biström, 1997
- Hydrovatus scholaeus Guignot, 1958
- Hydrovatus seminarius Motschulsky, 1859
- Hydrovatus semirufus Zimmermann, 1924
- Hydrovatus senegalensis Régimbart, 1895
- Hydrovatus seydeli Guignot, 1953
- Hydrovatus sharpi Branden, 1885
- Hydrovatus similis Biström, 1997
- Hydrovatus simoni Régimbart, 1894
- Hydrovatus sinister Sharp, 1890
- Hydrovatus sitistus Omer-Cooper, 1963
- Hydrovatus sobrinus Omer-Cooper, 1957
- Hydrovatus soror Biström, 1997
- Hydrovatus spadix Guignot, 1948
- Hydrovatus spissicornis Régimbart, 1905
- Hydrovatus sporas Guignot, 1959
- Hydrovatus stappersi Guignot, 1959
- Hydrovatus stridulus Biström, 1997
- Hydrovatus subparallelus Gschwendtner, 1930
- Hydrovatus subrotundatus Motschulsky, 1859
- Hydrovatus subtilis Sharp, 1882
- Hydrovatus sumatrensis Sharp, 1882
- Hydrovatus suturalis Bilardo & Pederzani, 1978
- Hydrovatus testudinarius Régimbart, 1895
- Hydrovatus tristis Guignot, 1961
- Hydrovatus turbinatus Zimmermann, 1921
- Hydrovatus tydaeus Biström, 1997
- Hydrovatus uhligi Biström, 1995
- Hydrovatus unguicularis Biström, 1997
- Hydrovatus unguiculatus Biström, 1997
- Hydrovatus uniformis (Fairmaire, 1869)
- Hydrovatus validicornis Régimbart, 1895
- Hydrovatus verisae Bilardo & Rocchi, 1987
- Hydrovatus vicinus Guignot, 1958
- Hydrovatus villiersi Guignot, 1955
- Hydrovatus visendus Biström, 1997
- Hydrovatus vividus Guignot, 1954
- Hydrovatus vulneratus Biström, 1997
- Hydrovatus vulpinus Biström, 1997
- Hydrovatus weiri Biström, 1997
- Hydrovatus wewalkai Biström, 1999
- Hydrovatus wittei Biström, 1997
- Hydrovatus yagii Kitayama, Mori & Matsui, 1993
- Hydrovatus youngi Biström, 1997
