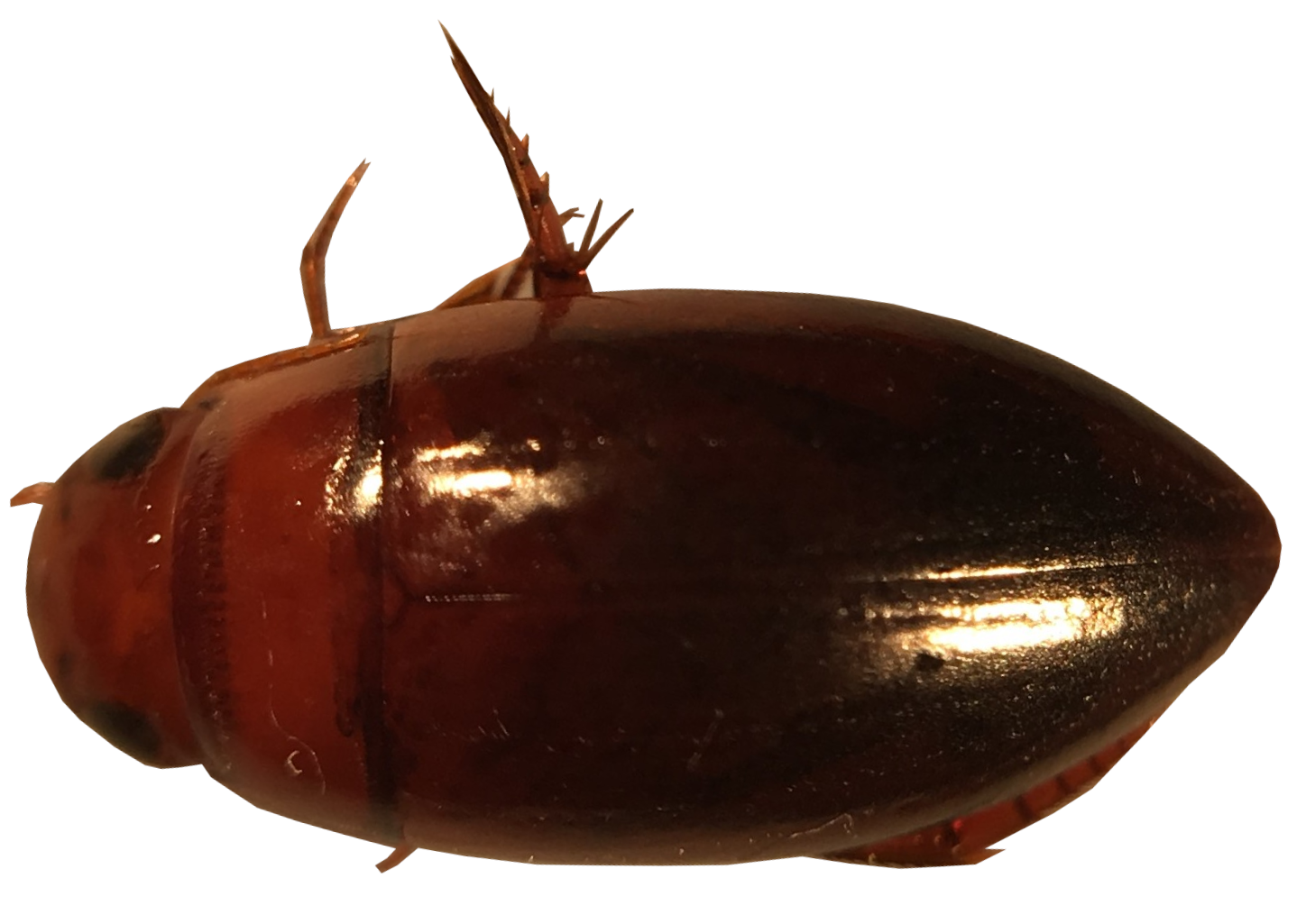
- Matus bicarinatus

Scientific classification
- Domain: Eukaryota
- Kingdom: Animalia
- Phylum: Arthropoda
- Class: Insecta
- Order: Coleoptera
- Suborder: Adephaga
- Family: Dytiscidae
- Subfamily: Matinae
- Genus: Matus; Aubé, 1836

= Matus (beetle) =

Genus of beetles

Matus is a genus of beetle in family Dytiscidae from North America. It contains the following species:

- Matus bicarinatus (Say, 1823)
- Matus leechi Young, 1953
- Matus ovatus Leech, 1941
- Matus relictus Young, 1953
