= Matus ovatus =

Scientific classification
- Domain: Eukaryota
- Kingdom: Animalia
- Phylum: Arthropoda
- Class: Insecta
- Order: Coleoptera
- Suborder: Adephaga
- Family: Dytiscidae
- Genus: Matus
- Species: M. ovatus

Binomial name
- Matus ovatus Leech, 1941

Species of beetle

Matus ovatus is a species of predaceous diving beetle in the family Dytiscidae. It is found in North America.

== Subspecies ==
These two subspecies belong to the species Matus ovatus:

- Matus ovatus blatchleyi Leech, 1941^{i c g}
- Matus ovatus ovatus Leech, 1941^{i c g}

Data sources: i = ITIS, c = Catalogue of Life, g = GBIF, b = Bugguide.net
