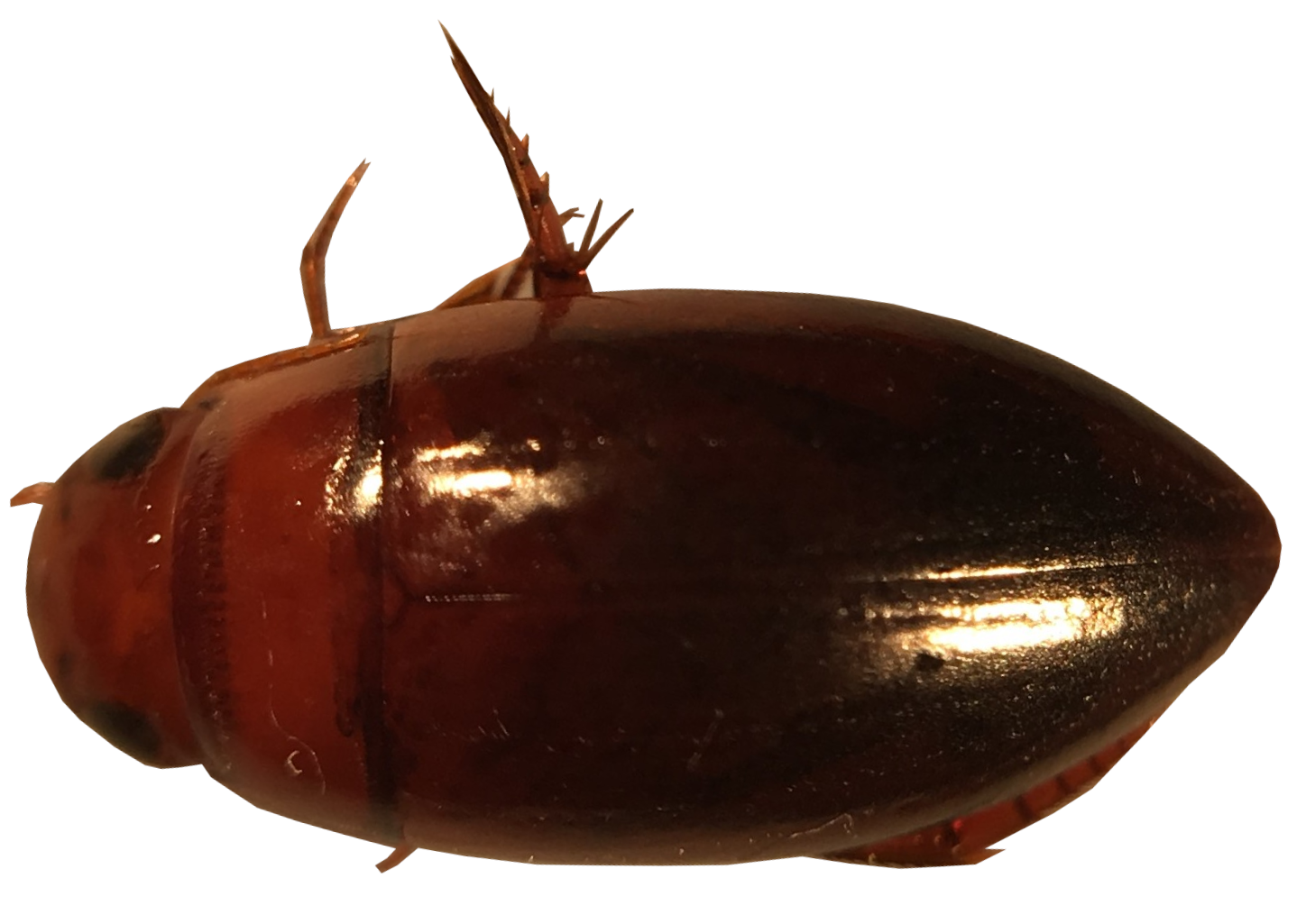

Scientific classification
- Domain: Eukaryota
- Kingdom: Animalia
- Phylum: Arthropoda
- Class: Insecta
- Order: Coleoptera
- Suborder: Adephaga
- Family: Dytiscidae
- Genus: Matus
- Species: M. bicarinatus

Binomial name
- Matus bicarinatus (Say, 1823)

= Matus bicarinatus =

Species of beetle

Matus bicarinatus is a species of predaceous diving beetle in the family Dytiscidae. It is found in North America.

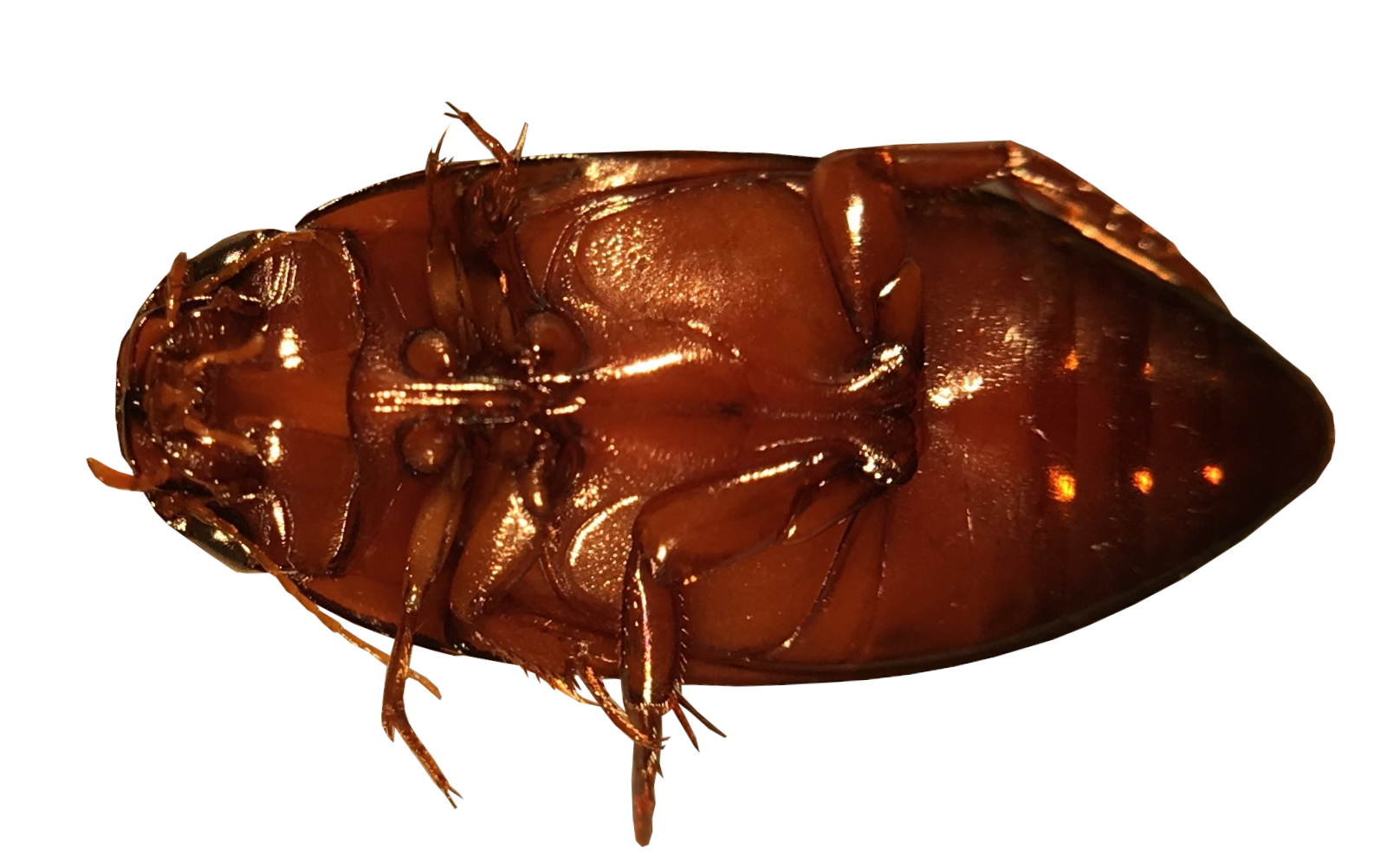
Ventral habitus

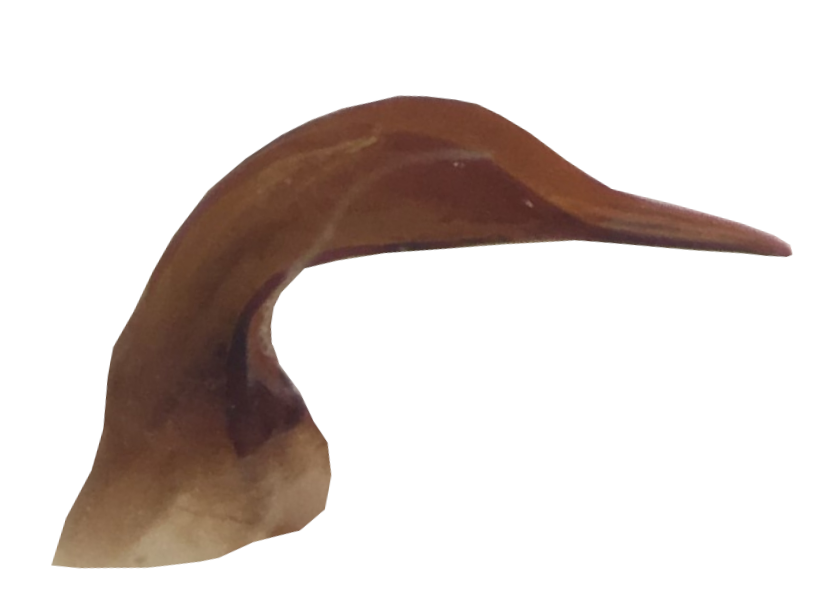
Aedeagus lateral view

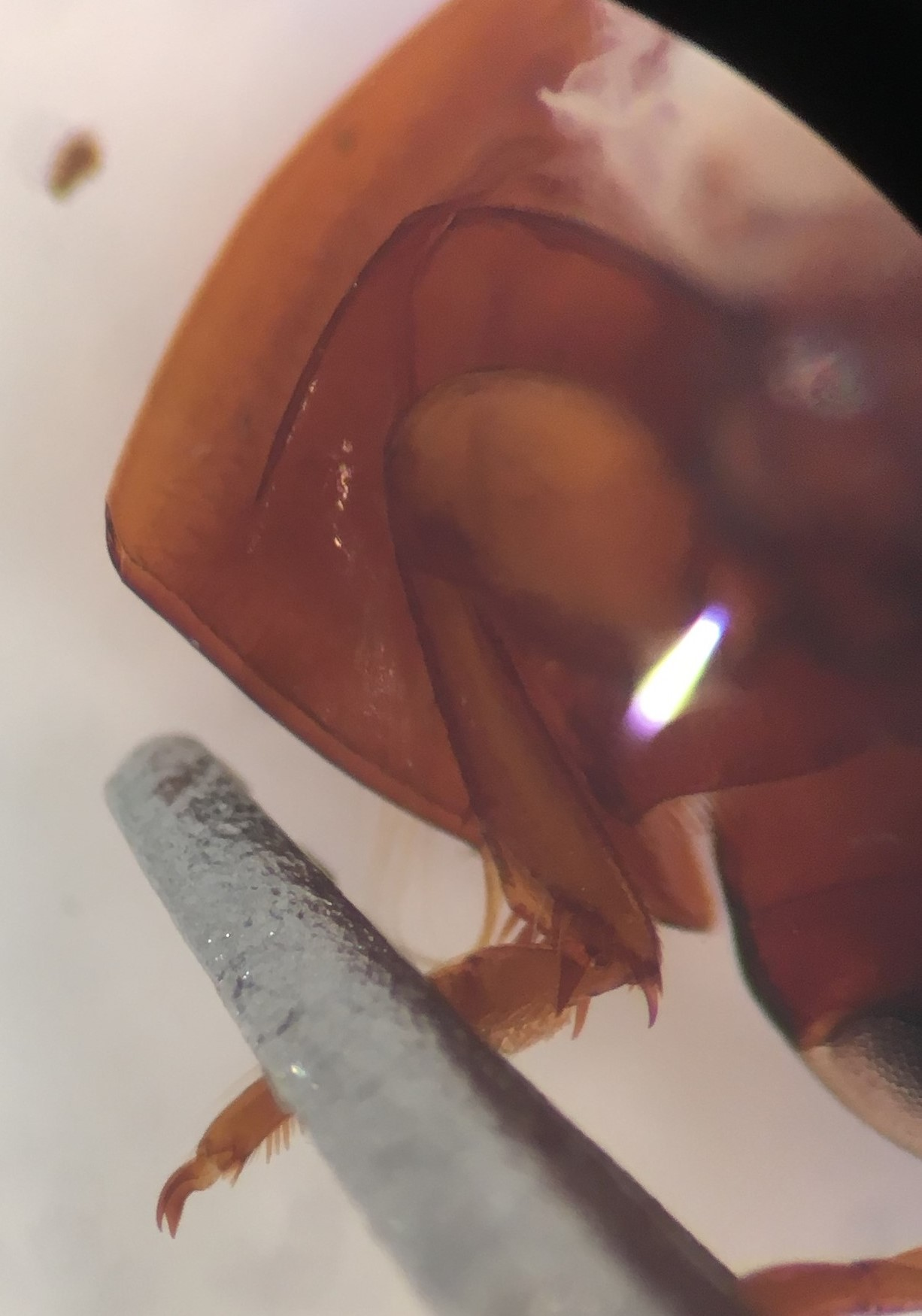
Male protarsal claws
