= Batrachomatus nannup =

Scientific classification
- Kingdom: Animalia
- Phylum: Arthropoda
- Clade: Pancrustacea
- Class: Insecta
- Order: Coleoptera
- Suborder: Adephaga
- Family: Dytiscidae
- Genus: Batrachomatus
- Species: B. nannup

Binomial name
- Batrachomatus nannup (Watts, 1978)

Synonyms
- Allomatus nannup Watts, 1978

Species of diving beetle

Batrachomatus nannup is a species of diving beetle in the family, Dytiscidae, first described as Allomatus nannup in 1978 by Chris H.S. Watts. The holotype was collected in Bridgetown, Western Australia. In a generic revision in 2013, Lars Hendrich and Michael Balke synonymised Allomatus Mouchamps, 1964 with Batrachomatus Clark, 1863, thus changing the species name.
