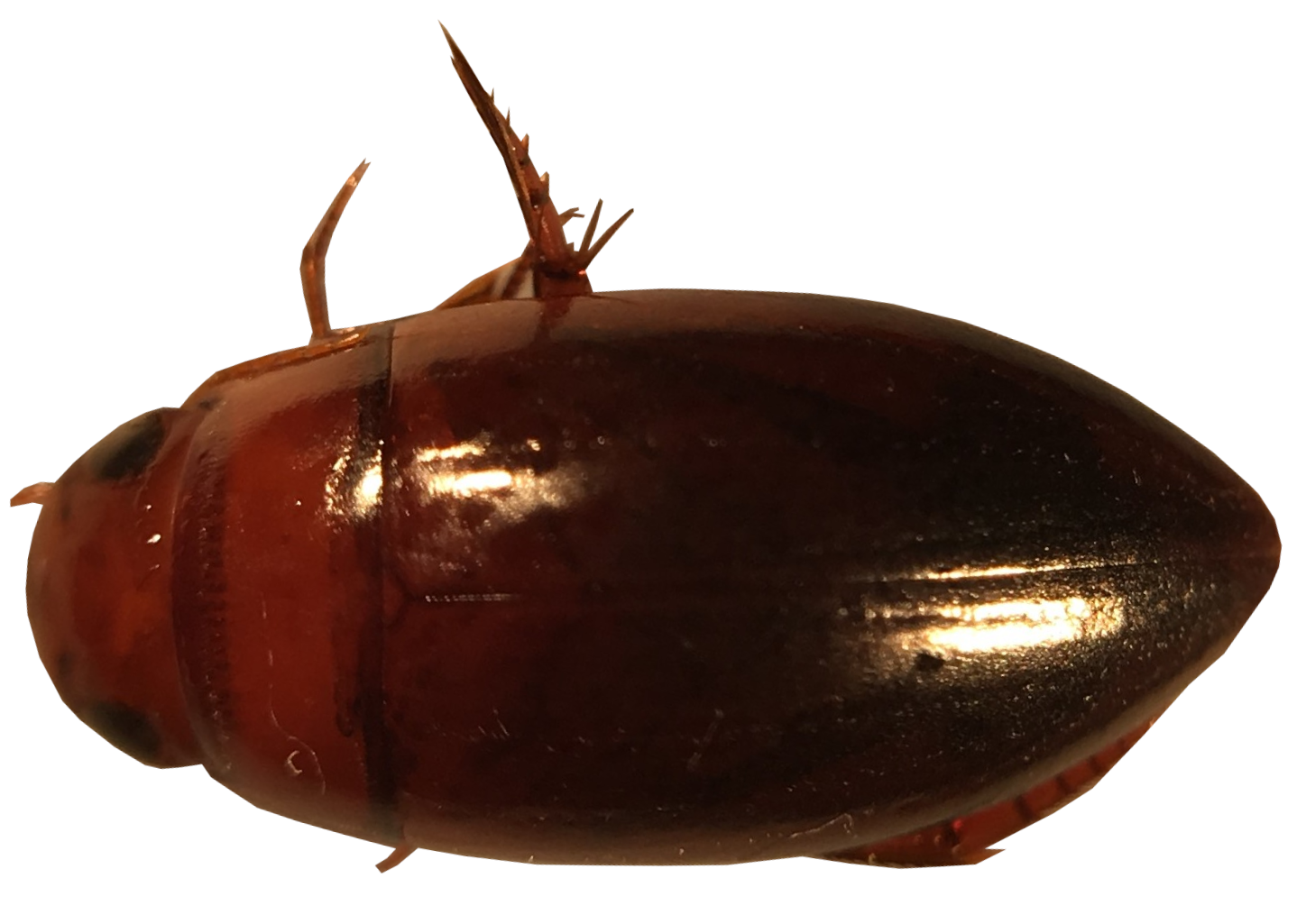
- Matus bicarinatus

Scientific classification
- Domain: Eukaryota
- Kingdom: Animalia
- Phylum: Arthropoda
- Class: Insecta
- Order: Coleoptera
- Suborder: Adephaga
- Family: Dytiscidae
- Subfamily: Matinae; Branden, 1885

= Matinae =

Subfamily of beetles

Matinae is a subfamily of predaceous diving beetles in the family Dytiscidae. There are at least 3 genera and about 10 described species in Matinae.

== Genera ==
These three genera belong to the subfamily Matinae:

- Allomatus Mouchamps, 1964
- Batrachomatus Clark, 1863
- Matus Aubé, 1836
