= Batrachomatus =

Scientific classification
- Kingdom: Animalia
- Phylum: Arthropoda
- Class: Insecta
- Order: Coleoptera
- Suborder: Adephaga
- Family: Dytiscidae
- Subfamily: Matinae
- Tribe: Matini
- Genus: Batrachomatus; Clark, 1863

Synonyms
- Allomatus Mouchamps, 1964

Genus of beetles

Batrachomatus is a genus of beetles in the family Dytiscidae, containing the following species:

- Batrachomatus daemeli (Sharp, 1882)
- Batrachomatus larsoni Hendrich & Balke, 2013
- Batrachomatus nannup (Watts, 1978)
- Batrachomatus wilsoni (Mouchamps, 1964)
- Batrachomatus wingii Clark, 1863
