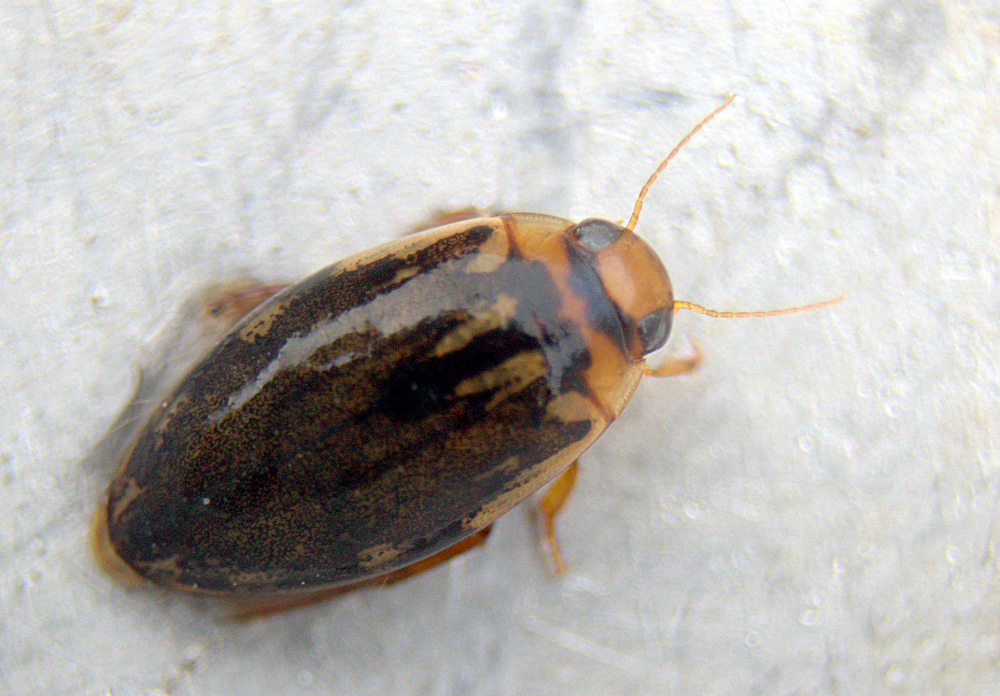

Scientific classification
- Domain: Eukaryota
- Kingdom: Animalia
- Phylum: Arthropoda
- Class: Insecta
- Order: Coleoptera
- Suborder: Adephaga
- Family: Dytiscidae
- Genus: Coptotomus
- Species: C. loticus

Binomial name
- Coptotomus loticus Hilsenhoff, 1980

= Coptotomus loticus =

Species of beetle

Coptotomus loticus is a species of predaceous diving beetle in the family Dytiscidae. It is found in North America.
