= Coptotomus interrogatus =

Scientific classification
- Kingdom: Animalia
- Phylum: Arthropoda
- Clade: Pancrustacea
- Class: Insecta
- Order: Coleoptera
- Suborder: Adephaga
- Family: Dytiscidae
- Genus: Coptotomus
- Species: C. interrogatus

Binomial name
- Coptotomus interrogatus (Fabricius, 1801)

Synonyms
- Coptotomus interrogatus obscurus Sharp, 1882; Coptotomus obscurus Sharp, 1882

Species of beetle

Coptotomus interrogatus is a species of predaceous diving beetle in the family Dytiscidae. It is found in North America and the Neotropics.
