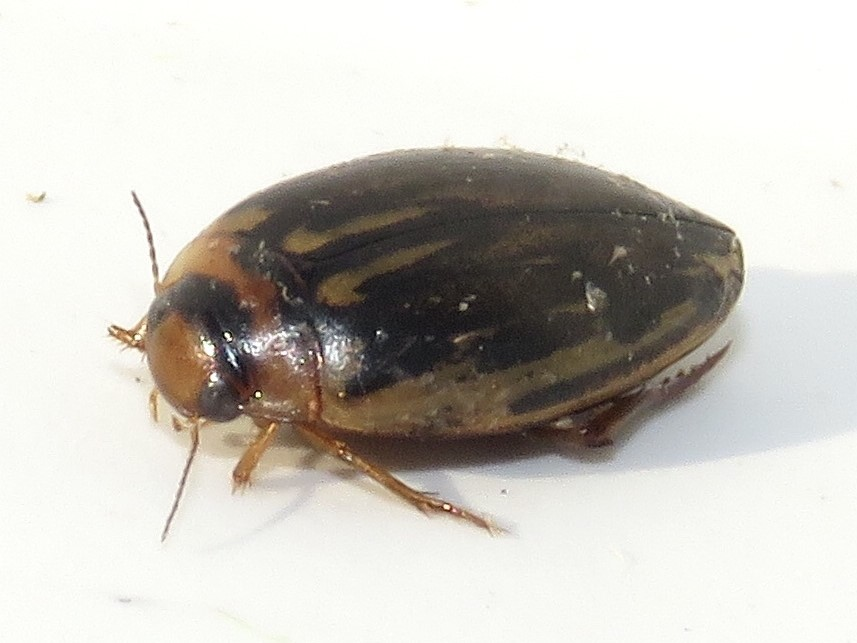
- Coptotomus longulus

Scientific classification
- Kingdom: Animalia
- Phylum: Arthropoda
- Clade: Pancrustacea
- Class: Insecta
- Order: Coleoptera
- Suborder: Adephaga
- Family: Dytiscidae
- Subfamily: Coptotominae
- Genus: Coptotomus; Say, 1830

= Coptotomus =

Genus of beetles

Coptotomus is a genus of predaceous diving beetles in the family Dytiscidae, the only genus of the subfamily Coptotominae. There are about six described species in Coptotomus, found in North America and the Neotropics.

There is one extinct species from the Palearctic.

== Species ==
These six species belong to the genus Coptotomus:

- †Coptotomus balticus Hendrich and Balke, 2020
- Coptotomus difficilis LeConte, 1852
- Coptotomus interrogatus (Fabricius, 1801)
- Coptotomus longulus LeConte, 1852
- Coptotomus loticus Hilsenhoff, 1980
- Coptotomus serripalpus Say, 1830
- Coptotomus venustus (Say, 1823)
