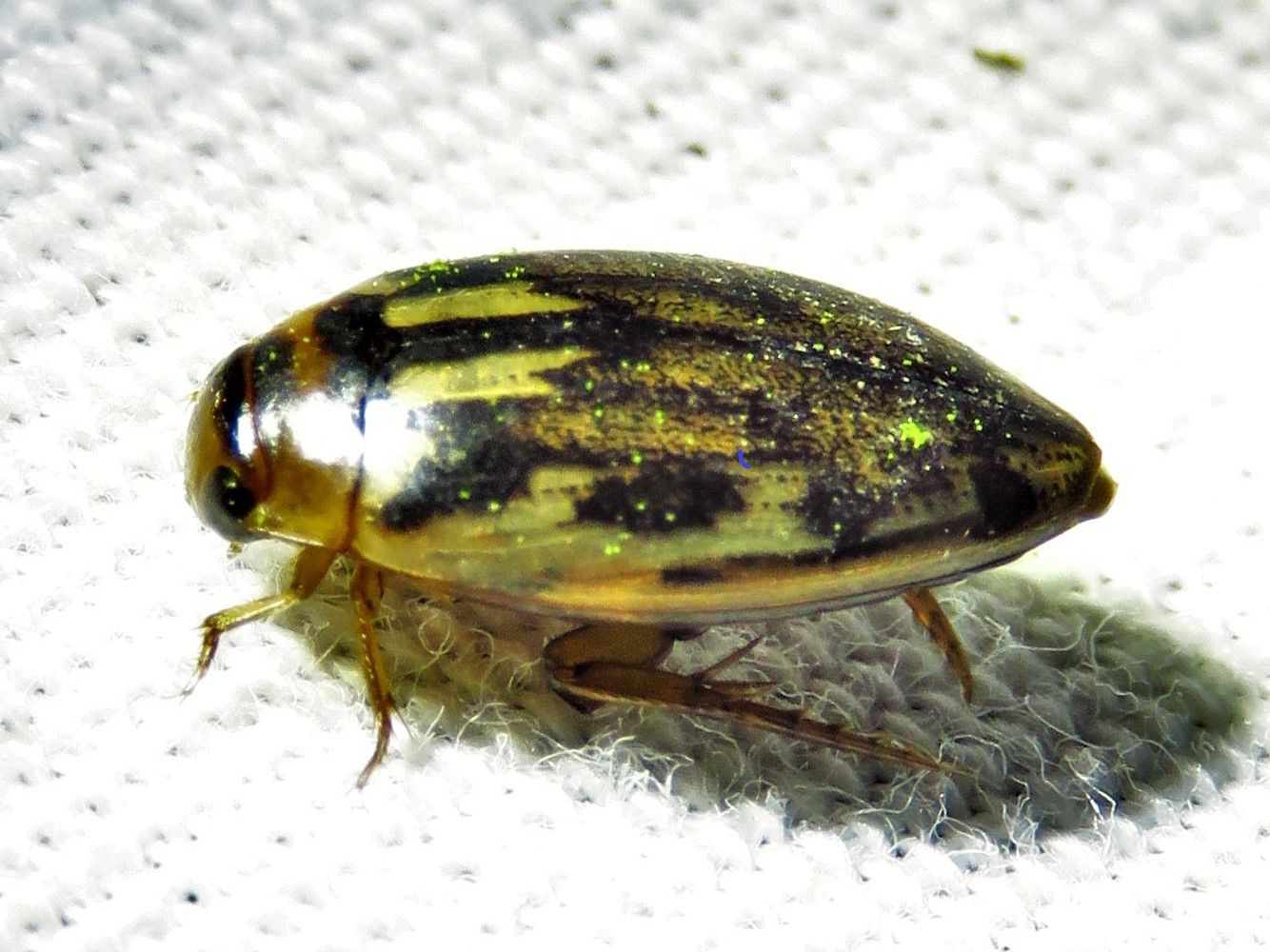

Scientific classification
- Domain: Eukaryota
- Kingdom: Animalia
- Phylum: Arthropoda
- Class: Insecta
- Order: Coleoptera
- Suborder: Adephaga
- Family: Dytiscidae
- Genus: Coptotomus
- Species: C. venustus

Binomial name
- Coptotomus venustus (Say, 1823)

= Coptotomus venustus =

Species of beetle

Coptotomus venustus is a species of predaceous diving beetle in the family Dytiscidae. It is found in North America and the Neotropics.
