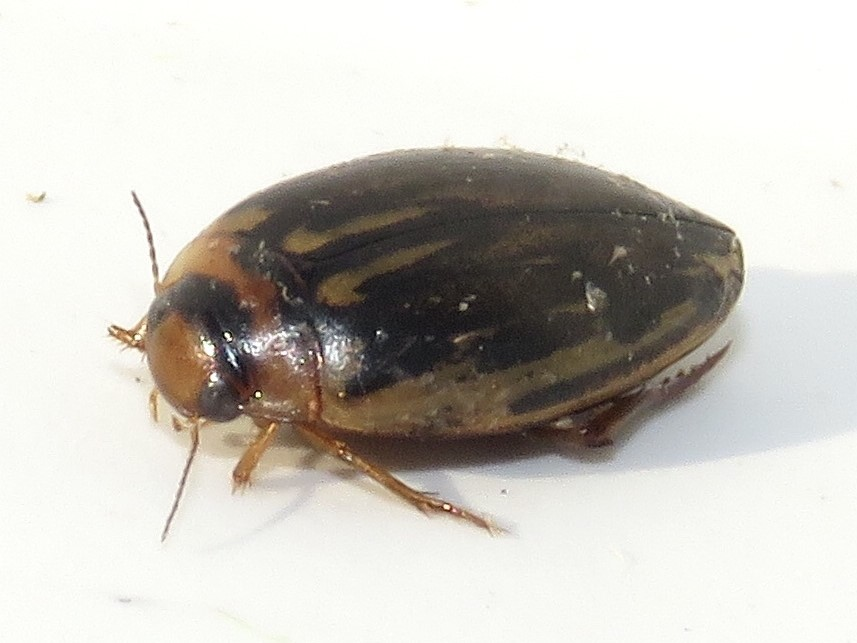

Scientific classification
- Domain: Eukaryota
- Kingdom: Animalia
- Phylum: Arthropoda
- Class: Insecta
- Order: Coleoptera
- Suborder: Adephaga
- Family: Dytiscidae
- Genus: Coptotomus
- Species: C. longulus

Binomial name
- Coptotomus longulus LeConte, 1852

= Coptotomus longulus =

Species of beetle

Coptotomus longulus is a species of predaceous diving beetle in the family Dytiscidae. It is found in North America.

== Subspecies ==
These two subspecies belong to the species Coptotomus longulus:

- Coptotomus longulus lenticus Hilsenhoff, 1980
- Coptotomus longulus longulus LeConte, 1852
