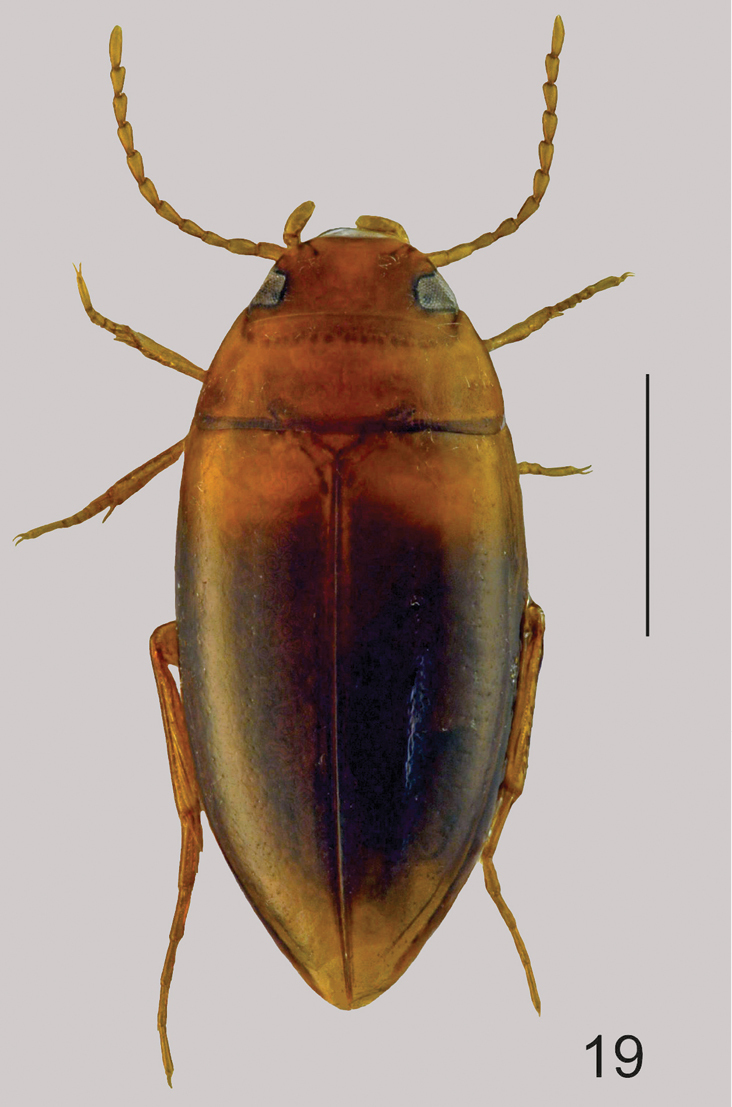
- Hydrodytes opalinus

Scientific classification
- Domain: Eukaryota
- Kingdom: Animalia
- Phylum: Arthropoda
- Class: Insecta
- Order: Coleoptera
- Suborder: Adephaga
- Family: Dytiscidae
- Subfamily: Hydrodytinae; Miller, 2001

= Hydrodytinae =

Subfamily of beetles

Hydrodytinae is a subfamily of predaceous diving beetles in the family Dytiscidae. There are at least two genera and four described species in Hydrodytinae.

== Genera and Species ==
These genera and species belong to the subfamily Hydrodytinae:

- Genus Hydrodytes K. B. Miller, 2001 (North America and the Neotropics)
  - Species Hydrodytes dodgei (Young, 1989) (North America)
  - Species Hydrodytes inaciculatus (Guignot, 1957) (Neotropics)
  - Species Hydrodytes opalinus (Zimmermann, 1921) (Neotropics)
- Genus Microhydrodytes K.B. Miller, 2002 (Neotropics)
  - Species Microhydrodytes elachistus K.B. Miller, 2002 (Neotropics)
