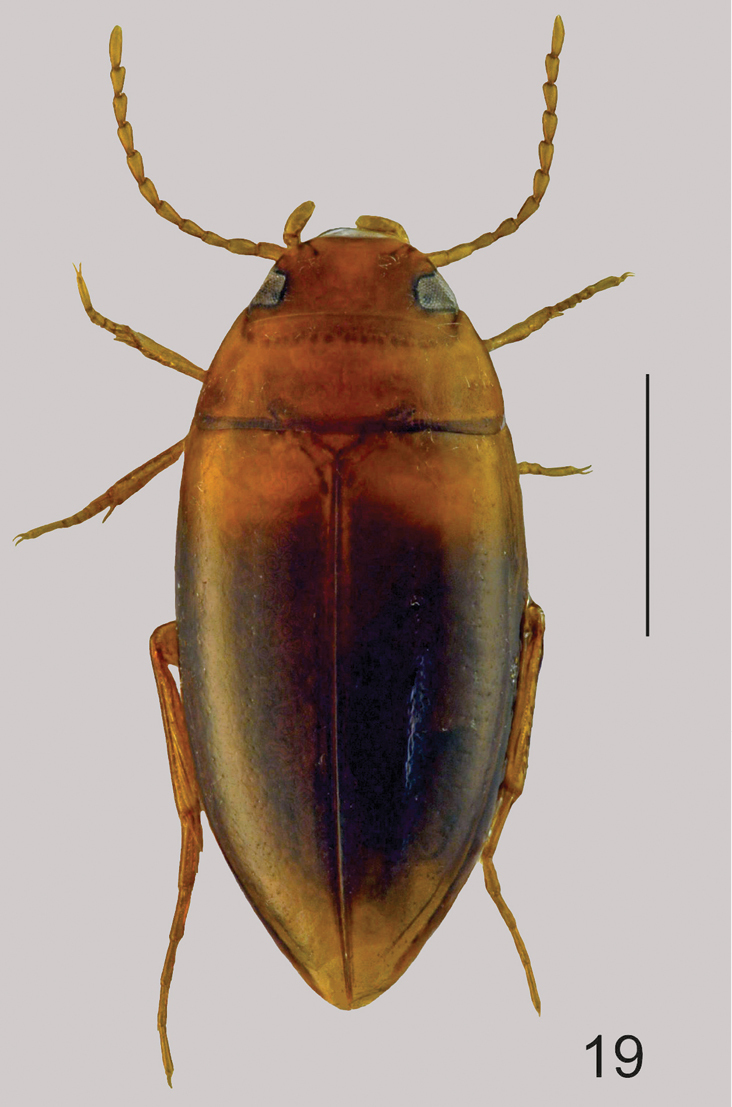
- Hydrodytes opalinus

Scientific classification
- Domain: Eukaryota
- Kingdom: Animalia
- Phylum: Arthropoda
- Class: Insecta
- Order: Coleoptera
- Suborder: Adephaga
- Family: Dytiscidae
- Subfamily: Hydrodytinae
- Tribe: Hydrodytini
- Genus: Hydrodytes; K. B. Miller, 2001

= Hydrodytes =

Genus of beetles

Hydrodytes is a genus of predaceous diving beetles in the family Dytiscidae. There are at least three described species in Hydrodytes. It is found in North America and the Neotropics.

== Species ==
These three species belong to the genus Hydrodytes:

- Hydrodytes dodgei (Young, 1989)
- Hydrodytes inaciculatus (Guignot, 1957)
- Hydrodytes opalinus (Zimmermann, 1921)
