= Hydrodytes dodgei =

Scientific classification
- Domain: Eukaryota
- Kingdom: Animalia
- Phylum: Arthropoda
- Class: Insecta
- Order: Coleoptera
- Suborder: Adephaga
- Family: Dytiscidae
- Tribe: Hydrodytini
- Genus: Hydrodytes
- Species: H. dodgei

Binomial name
- Hydrodytes dodgei (Young, 1989)

Species of beetle

Hydrodytes dodgei is a species of predaceous diving beetle in the family Dytiscidae. It is found in North America.
