= Laccodytes pumilio =

Scientific classification
- Kingdom: Animalia
- Phylum: Arthropoda
- Class: Insecta
- Order: Coleoptera
- Suborder: Adephaga
- Family: Dytiscidae
- Genus: Laccodytes
- Species: L. pumilio

Binomial name
- Laccodytes pumilio (LeConte, 1878)

Species of beetle

Laccodytes pumilio is a species of predaceous diving beetle in the family Dytiscidae. It is found in North America.
