= Laccodytes =

Scientific classification
- Kingdom: Animalia
- Phylum: Arthropoda
- Class: Insecta
- Order: Coleoptera
- Suborder: Adephaga
- Family: Dytiscidae
- Subfamily: Laccophilinae
- Genus: Laccodytes; Régimbart, 1895

Genus of beetles

Laccodytes is a genus of beetles in the family Dytiscidae, containing the following species:

- Laccodytes americanus Peschet, 1919
- Laccodytes apalodes Guignot, 1955
- Laccodytes olibroides Régimbart, 1895
- Laccodytes phalacroides Régimbart, 1895
- Laccodytes pumilio (LeConte, 1878)
