= Copelatus takakurai =

Scientific classification
- Domain: Eukaryota
- Kingdom: Animalia
- Phylum: Arthropoda
- Class: Insecta
- Order: Coleoptera
- Suborder: Adephaga
- Family: Dytiscidae
- Genus: Copelatus
- Species: C. takakurai

Binomial name
- Copelatus takakurai Satô, 1985

Species of beetle

Copelatus takakurai is a species of diving beetle. It is part of the subfamily Copelatinae in the family Dytiscidae. It was described by Satô in 1985.
