= Copelatus mahajanga =

Scientific classification
- Domain: Eukaryota
- Kingdom: Animalia
- Phylum: Arthropoda
- Class: Insecta
- Order: Coleoptera
- Suborder: Adephaga
- Family: Dytiscidae
- Genus: Copelatus
- Species: C. mahajanga

Binomial name
- Copelatus mahajanga Pederzani & Hájek, 2005

Species of beetle

Copelatus mahajanga is a species of diving beetle. It is part of the genus Copelatus, which is in the subfamily Copelatinae of the family Dytiscidae. It was described by Pederzani & Hájek in 2005.
