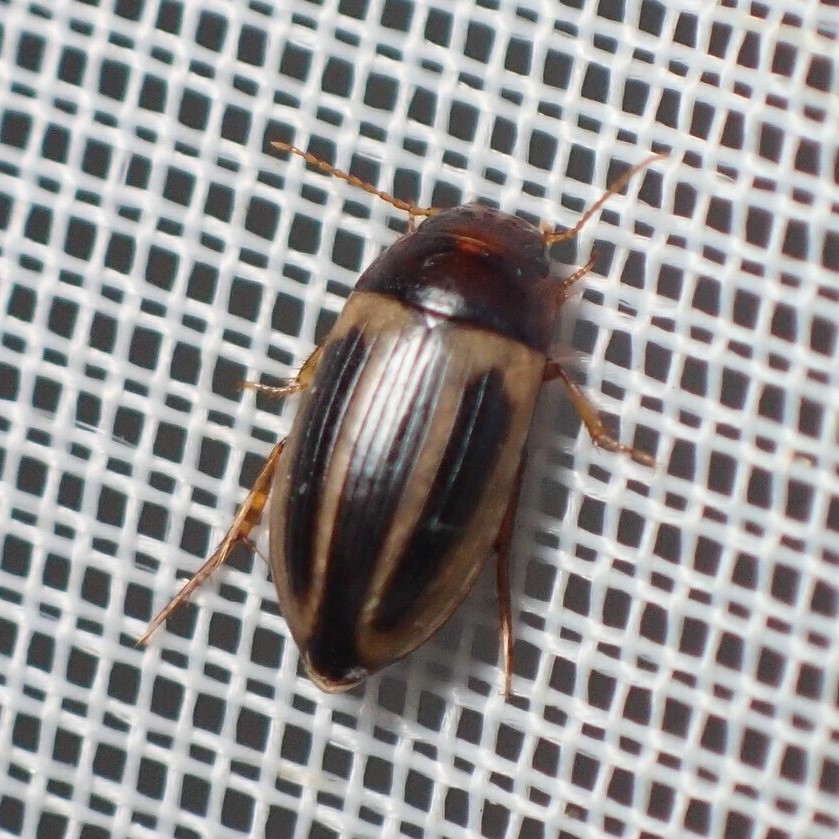

Scientific classification
- Domain: Eukaryota
- Kingdom: Animalia
- Phylum: Arthropoda
- Class: Insecta
- Order: Coleoptera
- Suborder: Adephaga
- Family: Dytiscidae
- Genus: Copelatus
- Species: C. nakamurai

Binomial name
- Copelatus nakamurai Guéorguiev, 1970

= Copelatus nakamurai =

Species of beetle

Copelatus nakamurai is a species of diving beetle in the family Dytiscidae. It was first described by Guéorguiev in 1970.
