= Copelatus predaveterus =

Scientific classification
- Domain: Eukaryota
- Kingdom: Animalia
- Phylum: Arthropoda
- Class: Insecta
- Order: Coleoptera
- Suborder: Adephaga
- Family: Dytiscidae
- Genus: Copelatus
- Species: C. predaveterus

Binomial name
- Copelatus predaveterus K. B. Miller, 2003

Species of beetle

Copelatus predaveterus is a species of diving beetle. It is part of the genus Copelatus in the subfamily Copelatinae of the family Dytiscidae. It was described by K. B. Miller in 2003.
