= Copelatus pederzanii =

Scientific classification
- Domain: Eukaryota
- Kingdom: Animalia
- Phylum: Arthropoda
- Class: Insecta
- Order: Coleoptera
- Suborder: Adephaga
- Family: Dytiscidae
- Genus: Copelatus
- Species: C. pederzanii

Binomial name
- Copelatus pederzanii Bilardo & Rocchi, 1995

Synonyms
- Copelatus apuzzoi Bilardo & Rocchi, 1999

Species of beetle

Copelatus pederzanii is a species of diving beetle. It is part of the genus Copelatus in the subfamily Copelatinae of the family Dytiscidae. It was described by Bilardo & Rocchi in 1995.
