= Copelatus erichsonii =

Scientific classification
- Domain: Eukaryota
- Kingdom: Animalia
- Phylum: Arthropoda
- Class: Insecta
- Order: Coleoptera
- Suborder: Adephaga
- Family: Dytiscidae
- Genus: Copelatus
- Species: C. erichsonii

Binomial name
- Copelatus erichsonii Guérin-Méneville, 1849

Species of beetle

Copelatus erichsonii is a species of diving beetle. It is part of the genus Copelatus of the subfamily Copelatinae in the family Dytiscidae. It was described by Félix Édouard Guérin-Méneville in 1849.
