= Copelatus onorei =

Scientific classification
- Domain: Eukaryota
- Kingdom: Animalia
- Phylum: Arthropoda
- Class: Insecta
- Order: Coleoptera
- Suborder: Adephaga
- Family: Dytiscidae
- Genus: Copelatus
- Species: C. onorei

Binomial name
- Copelatus onorei Pederzani & Rocchi, 1982

Species of beetle

Copelatus onorei is a species of diving beetle. It is part of the genus Copelatus in the subfamily Copelatinae of the family Dytiscidae. It was described by Pederzani & Rocchi in 1982.
