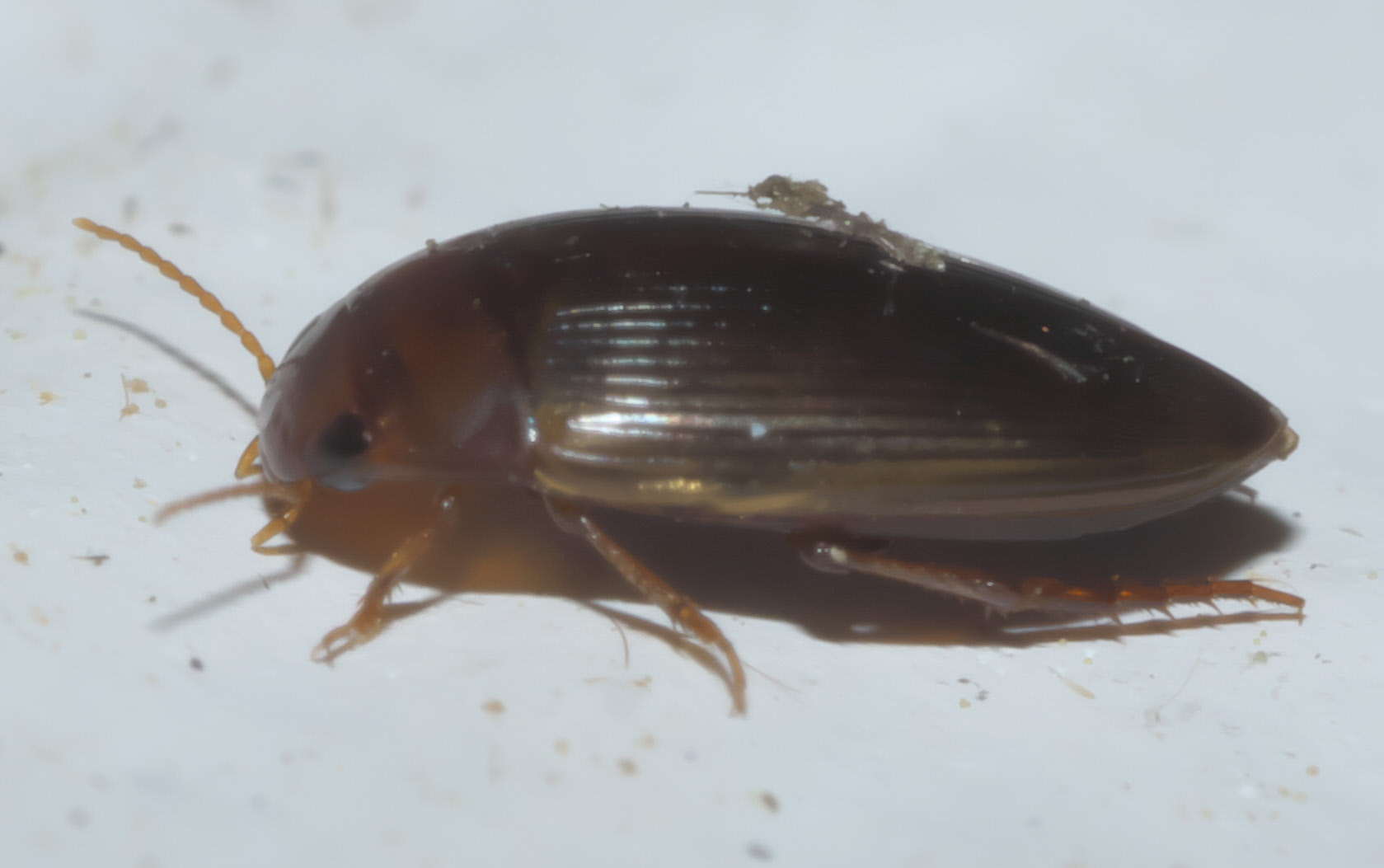

Conservation status
- Unranked (NatureServe)

Scientific classification
- Kingdom: Animalia
- Phylum: Arthropoda
- Class: Insecta
- Order: Coleoptera
- Suborder: Adephaga
- Family: Dytiscidae
- Genus: Copelatus
- Species: C. glyphicus

Binomial name
- Copelatus glyphicus (Say, 1823)

Synonyms
- Colymbetes glyphicus Say, 1823; Copelatus decemstriatus Aubé, 1838

= Copelatus glyphicus =

Species of beetle

Copelatus glyphicus is a species of diving beetle. It is part of the subfamily Copelatinae of the family Dytiscidae. It was described by Thomas Say in 1823.

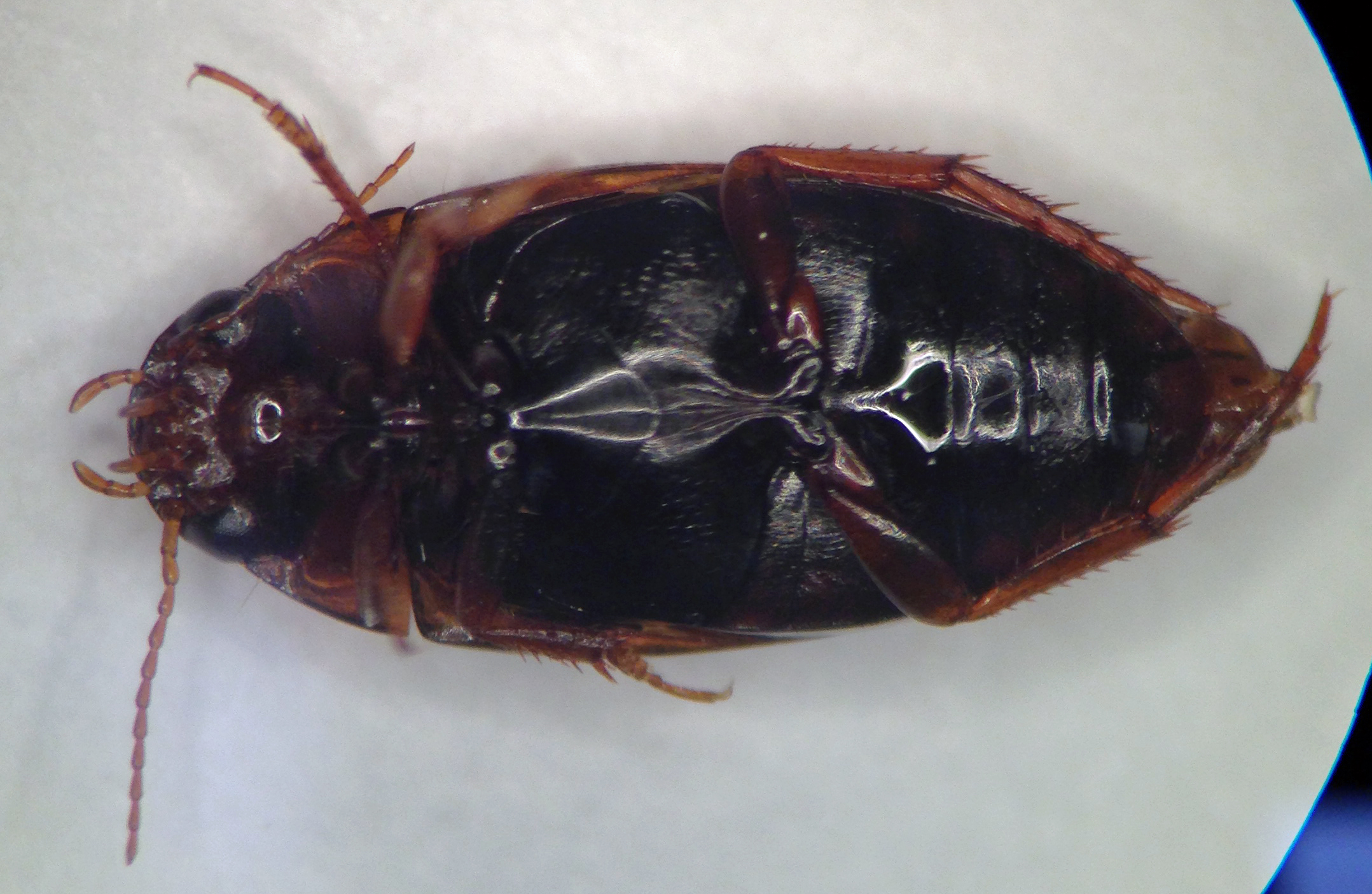
Ventral view

== Distribution ==
Copelatus glyphicus is widely distributed throughout the eastern United States and southern Canada, ranging from Newfoundland south to Florida and west to Minnesota and Texas.

== Description ==
Adults range in length from 4.2 to 4.6 millimetres (0.17 to 0.18 in) and width from 2.1 to 2.5 millimetres (0.083 to 0.098 in) and have a pale yellowish brown to reddish brown coloration.
