= Copelatus esteriensis =

Scientific classification
- Domain: Eukaryota
- Kingdom: Animalia
- Phylum: Arthropoda
- Class: Insecta
- Order: Coleoptera
- Suborder: Adephaga
- Family: Dytiscidae
- Genus: Copelatus
- Species: C. esteriensis

Binomial name
- Copelatus esteriensis Bilardo & Pederzani, 1978

Species of beetle

Copelatus esteriensis is a species of diving beetle. It is part of the genus Copelatus in the subfamily Copelatinae of the family Dytiscidae. It was described by Bilardo & Pederzani in 1978.
