= Copelatus tucuchiensis =

Scientific classification
- Domain: Eukaryota
- Kingdom: Animalia
- Phylum: Arthropoda
- Class: Insecta
- Order: Coleoptera
- Suborder: Adephaga
- Family: Dytiscidae
- Genus: Copelatus
- Species: C. tucuchiensis

Binomial name
- Copelatus tucuchiensis J.Balfour-Browne, 1939

Species of beetle

Copelatus tucuchiensis is a species of diving beetle. It is part of the subfamily Copelatinae, which belongs to the family Dytiscidae. Copelatus tucuchiensis has been described by Balfour-Browne in 1939.
