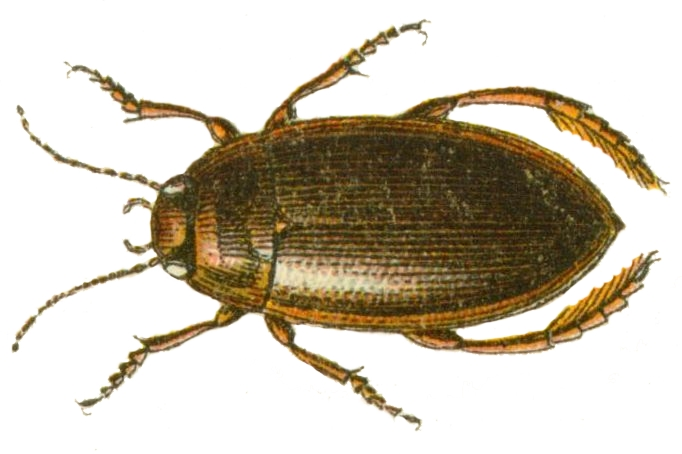
- Copelatus haemorrhoidalis (Fabricius, 1787), adult from dorsal

Scientific classification
- Domain: Eukaryota
- Kingdom: Animalia
- Phylum: Arthropoda
- Class: Insecta
- Order: Coleoptera
- Suborder: Adephaga
- Family: Dytiscidae
- Genus: Copelatus
- Species: C. haemorrhoidalis

Binomial name
- Copelatus haemorrhoidalis Régimbart, 1883

Synonyms
- Copelatus aruensis J. Balfour-Browne, 1938

= Copelatus haemorrhoidalis =

Species of beetle

Copelatus haemorrhoidalis is a species of diving beetle. It is part of the genus Copelatus in the subfamily Copelatinae of the family Dytiscidae. It was described by Régimbart in 1883.
