= Copelatus kalaharii =

Scientific classification
- Kingdom: Animalia
- Phylum: Arthropoda
- Clade: Pancrustacea
- Class: Insecta
- Order: Coleoptera
- Suborder: Adephaga
- Family: Dytiscidae
- Genus: Copelatus
- Species: C. kalaharii

Binomial name
- Copelatus kalaharii Gschwendtner, 1935

Species of beetle

Copelatus kalaharii is a species of diving beetle described by Gschwendtner in 1935. It is part of the genus Copelatus in the subfamily Copelatinae of the family Dytiscidae.
