= Copelatus sulcipennis =

Scientific classification
- Domain: Eukaryota
- Kingdom: Animalia
- Phylum: Arthropoda
- Class: Insecta
- Order: Coleoptera
- Suborder: Adephaga
- Family: Dytiscidae
- Genus: Copelatus
- Species: C. sulcipennis

Binomial name
- Copelatus sulcipennis (Laporte, 1835)

Species of beetle

Copelatus sulcipennis is a species of diving beetle. It is part of the subfamily Copelatinae in the family Dytiscidae. It was described by Laporte in 1835.
