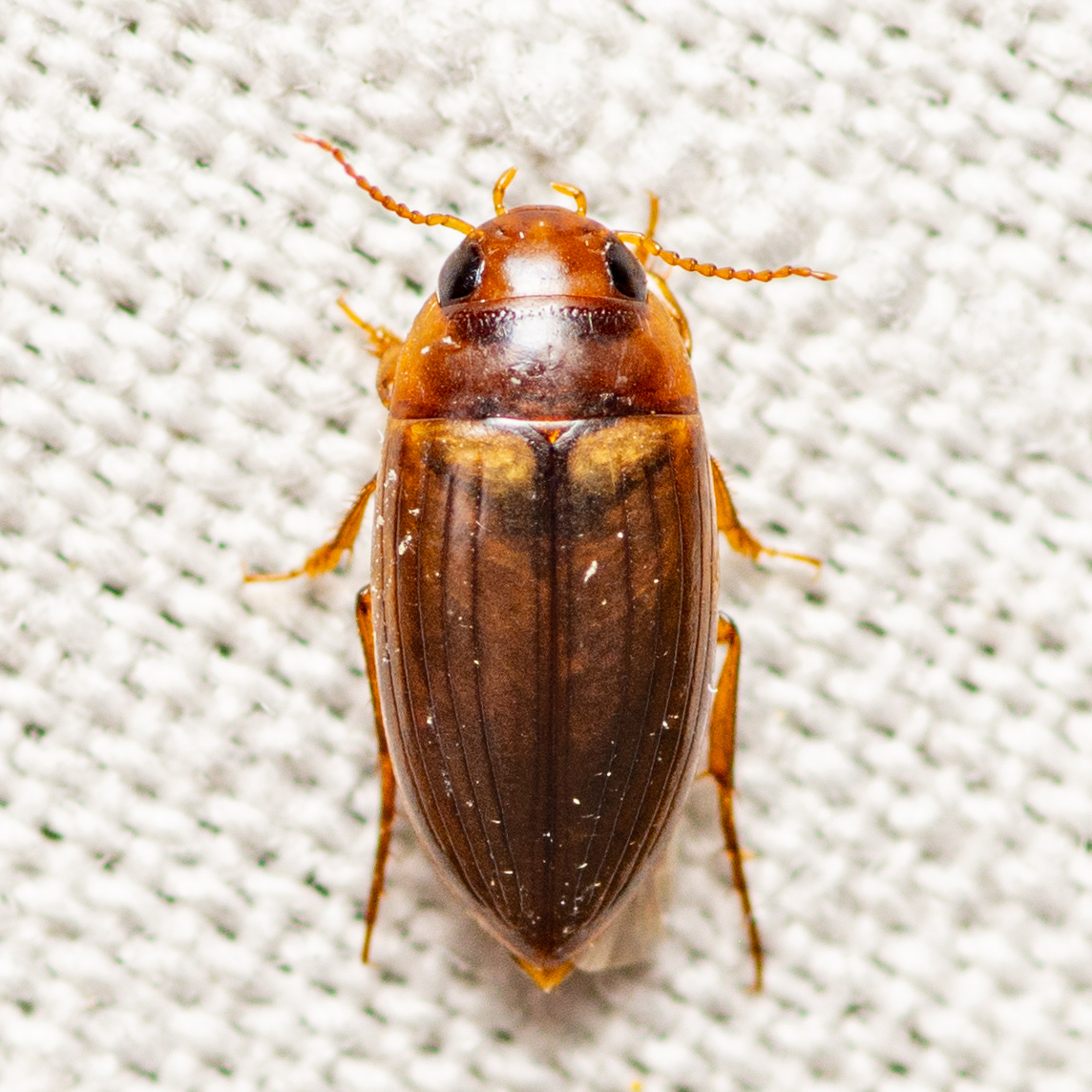

Scientific classification
- Kingdom: Animalia
- Phylum: Arthropoda
- Class: Insecta
- Order: Coleoptera
- Suborder: Adephaga
- Family: Dytiscidae
- Genus: Copelatus
- Species: C. debilis

Binomial name
- Copelatus debilis Sharp, 1882

= Copelatus debilis =

Species of beetle

Copelatus debilis is a species of diving beetle. It is part of the genus Copelatus of the subfamily Copelatinae in the family Dytiscidae. It is found in Central America and North America. It was described by Sharp in 1882.
