= Copelatus parumstriatus =

Scientific classification
- Domain: Eukaryota
- Kingdom: Animalia
- Phylum: Arthropoda
- Class: Insecta
- Order: Coleoptera
- Suborder: Adephaga
- Family: Dytiscidae
- Genus: Copelatus
- Species: C. parumstriatus

Binomial name
- Copelatus parumstriatus Gschwendtner, 1934

Species of beetle

Copelatus parumstriatus is a species of diving beetle in the genus Copelatus, subfamily Copelatinae, family Dytiscidae. It was described by Gschwendtner in 1934.
