= Copelatus waltoni =

Scientific classification
- Domain: Eukaryota
- Kingdom: Animalia
- Phylum: Arthropoda
- Class: Insecta
- Order: Coleoptera
- Suborder: Adephaga
- Family: Dytiscidae
- Genus: Copelatus
- Species: C. waltoni

Binomial name
- Copelatus waltoni J. Balfour-Browne, 1950

Species of beetle

Copelatus waltoni is a species of diving beetle. It is part of the subfamily Copelatinae in the family Dytiscidae. It was described by J. Balfour-Browne in 1950.
