= Copelatus schuhi =

Scientific classification
- Kingdom: Animalia
- Phylum: Arthropoda
- Class: Insecta
- Order: Coleoptera
- Suborder: Adephaga
- Family: Dytiscidae
- Genus: Copelatus
- Species: C. schuhi

Binomial name
- Copelatus schuhi Hendrich & Balke, 1998

Species of beetle

Copelatus schuhi is a species of diving beetle. It is part of the subfamily Copelatinae in the family Dytiscidae. It was described by Hendrich & Balke in 1998.
