= Copelatus curtistriatus =

Scientific classification
- Kingdom: Animalia
- Phylum: Arthropoda
- Class: Insecta
- Order: Coleoptera
- Suborder: Adephaga
- Family: Dytiscidae
- Genus: Copelatus
- Species: C. curtistriatus

Binomial name
- Copelatus curtistriatus Bilardo & Rocchi, 1995

Species of beetle

Copelatus curtistriatus is a species of diving beetle. It is part of the genus Copelatus of the subfamily Copelatinae in the family Dytiscidae. It was described by Bilardo & Rocchi in 1995.
