= Copelatus vagestriatus =

Scientific classification
- Domain: Eukaryota
- Kingdom: Animalia
- Phylum: Arthropoda
- Class: Insecta
- Order: Coleoptera
- Suborder: Adephaga
- Family: Dytiscidae
- Genus: Copelatus
- Species: C. vagestriatus

Binomial name
- Copelatus vagestriatus Zimmermann, 1919

Species of beetle

Copelatus vagestriatus is a species of diving beetle. It is part of the subfamily Copelatinae in the family Dytiscidae. It was described by Zimmermann in 1919.
