= Copelatus masculinus =

Scientific classification
- Domain: Eukaryota
- Kingdom: Animalia
- Phylum: Arthropoda
- Class: Insecta
- Order: Coleoptera
- Suborder: Adephaga
- Family: Dytiscidae
- Genus: Copelatus
- Species: C. masculinus

Binomial name
- Copelatus masculinus Régimbart, 1899

Synonyms
- Copelatus imasakai Matsui & Kitayama, 2000

Species of beetle

Copelatus masculinus is a species of diving beetle. It is part of the genus Copelatus, which is in the subfamily Copelatinae of the family Dytiscidae. It was described by Régimbart in 1899.
