= Copelatus binaghii =

Scientific classification
- Domain: Eukaryota
- Kingdom: Animalia
- Phylum: Arthropoda
- Class: Insecta
- Order: Coleoptera
- Suborder: Adephaga
- Family: Dytiscidae
- Genus: Copelatus
- Species: C. binaghii

Binomial name
- Copelatus binaghii Bilardo & Pederzani, 1953

Species of beetle

Copelatus binaghii is a species of diving beetle. It is part of the genus Copelatus and in the subfamily Copelatinae of the family Dytiscidae. It was described by Bilardo & Pederzani in 1953.
