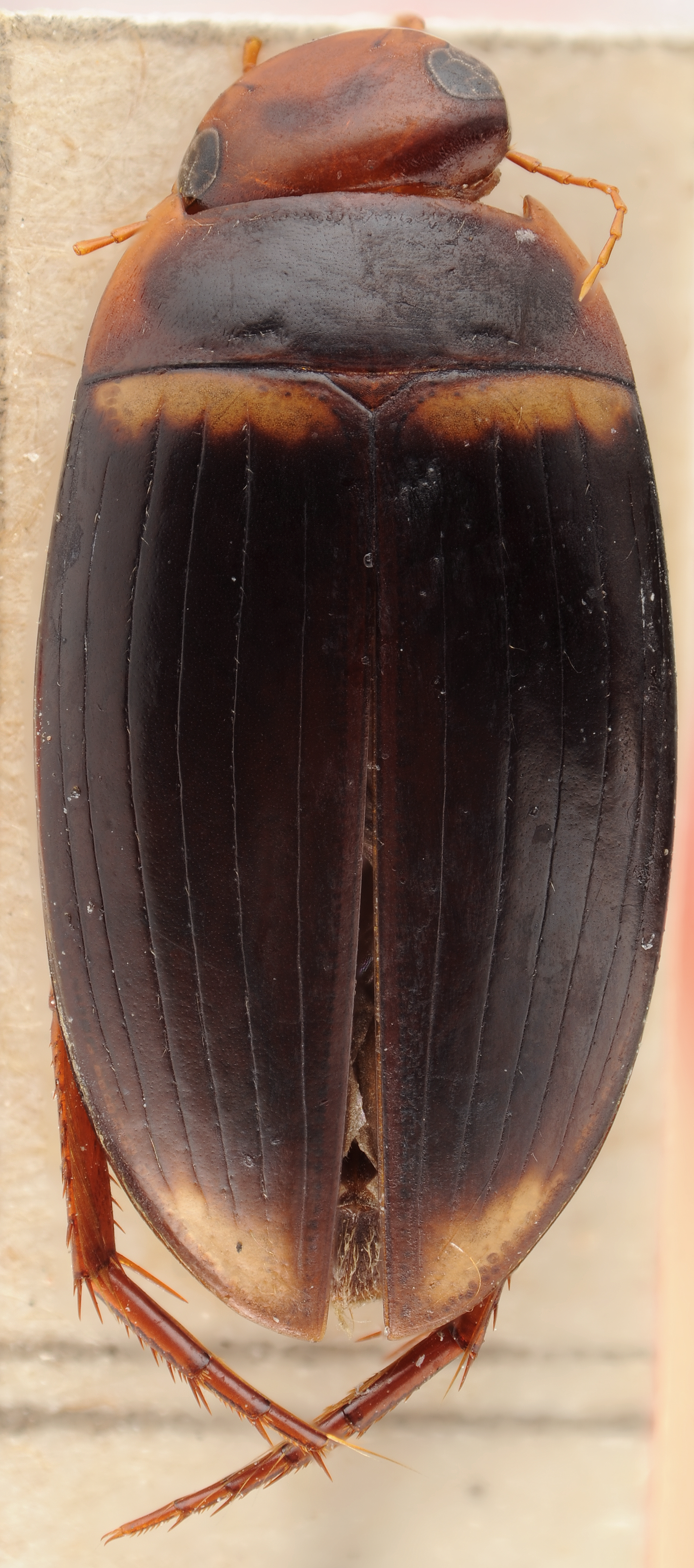
- Copelatus biroi

Scientific classification
- Kingdom: Animalia
- Phylum: Arthropoda
- Class: Insecta
- Order: Coleoptera
- Suborder: Adephaga
- Family: Dytiscidae
- Subfamily: Copelatinae
- Tribe: Copelatini
- Genus: Copelatus; Erichson, 1832

= Copelatus =

Copelatus Temporal range: Eocene – present

Genus of diving beetles

Copelatus is a large genus of small diving beetles. There are some 470 described species in the genus, found worldwide, but they are most diverse in tropical South America, Africa and South-East Asia. Copelatus are often black or brown in color, many species of Copelatus possessing visible longitudinal furrows down the dorsal side of the wings of both sexes.

== Systematics ==
The genus Copelatus is divided into several subgenera (Colepatus, Papuadytes etc.), some of which are sometimes treated as separate genera. It may be paraphyletic with respect to the smaller Copelatinae genera Lacconectus and Aglymbus. The species include:

== Species ==
- Copelatus abonnenci Guignot, 1939
- Copelatus acamas Guignot, 1955
- Copelatus adelbert Megna, Atthakor, Manaono, Hendrich & Balke, 2017
- Copelatus advena Sharp, 1882
- Copelatus aemulus Bilardo & Rocchi, 1995
- Copelatus aequatorius Régimbart, 1899
- Copelatus aethiopicus Régimbart, 1906
- Copelatus agaroensis Balke, 2008
- Copelatus agrias Guignot, 1954
- Copelatus alternatus Sharp, 1882
- Copelatus amaroides Guignot, 1952
- Copelatus amatolensis Omer-Cooper, 1965
- Copelatus amazonicus Régimbart, 1889
- Copelatus ambiguus Bertrand & Legros, 1975
- Copelatus amphibius Ranarilalatiana & Bergsten, 2019
- Copelatus anastomosans Guignot, 1952
- Copelatus andobonicus Guignot, 1960
- Copelatus andreinii Régimbart, 1905
- Copelatus andrewesi J. Balfour-Browne, 1939
- Copelatus angolensis Peschet, 1924
- Copelatus angouei Bilardo & Rocchi, 2011
- Copelatus angustus Gschwendtner, 1932
- Copelatus ankaratra Ranarilalatiana & Bergsten, 2019
- Copelatus annobomensis J. Balfour-Browne, 1939
- Copelatus anthracinus Régimbart, 1895
- Copelatus antoniorum Hájek & Brancucci, 2011
- †Copelatus aphroditae Balke, 2003
- Copelatus apicinotatus Bilardo & Rocchi, 2018
- Copelatus assalyi Bilardo & Rocchi, 2010
- Copelatus assimilis Régimbart, 1895
- Copelatus ateles Guignot, 1955
- Copelatus atrosulcatus Régimbart, 1906
- Copelatus babyrousa Hájek, Hendrich & Balke, 2018
- Copelatus bacchusi Wewalka, 1981
- Copelatus bacillifer Guignot, 1955
- Copelatus baculiformis Guignot, 1955
- Copelatus badeni Sharp, 1882
- Copelatus bakewelli J. Balfour-Browne, 1939
- Copelatus baoulicus Bilardo & Pederzani, 1978
- Copelatus bapounouensis Bilardo & Rocchi, 2019
- Copelatus baranensis Hájek, Shaverdo, Hendrich & Balke, 2021
- Copelatus barbouri Young, 1942
- Copelatus basifasciatus Régimbart, 1895
- Copelatus basilewskyi Bilardo & Pederzani, 1979
- Copelatus bechynei Guignot, 1953
- Copelatus befasicus Guignot, 1956
- Copelatus bengalensis Guignot, 1955
- Copelatus bertrandi Nilsson, Bilardo & Rocchi, 1996
- Copelatus betampona Ranarilalatiana & Bergsten, 2019
- Copelatus bezdeki Sheth, Ghate & Hájek, 2018
- Copelatus bibulus Guignot, 1948
- Copelatus biformis Sharp, 1882
- Copelatus bimaculatus (Resende & Vanin, 1991)
- Copelatus binaghii Bilardo & Pederzani, 1978
- Copelatus biolleyi Guignot, 1952
- Copelatus biroi Guignot, 1956
- Copelatus birougouensis Bilardo & Rocchi, 2018
- Copelatus biseriatus J. Balfour-Browne, 1939
- Copelatus biswasi Mukherjee & Sengupta, 1986
- Copelatus blancasi Guignot, 1958
- Copelatus blatchleyi Young, 1953 NA
- Copelatus bolivianus Guignot, 1957
- Copelatus bombycinus Guignot, 1952
- Copelatus bonvouloiri Sharp, 1882
- Copelatus bottegoi Régimbart, 1895
- Copelatus bougainvillensis Hájek, Shaverdo, Hendrich & Balke, 2021
- Copelatus boukali Hendrich & Balke, 1998
- Copelatus brancuccii Rocchi, 1979
- Copelatus brasiliensis Zimmermann, 1921
- Copelatus brendelli Hájek, Hendrich & Balke, 2018
- Copelatus brevicornis (Sharp, 1882)
- Copelatus brevistrigatus Guignot, 1959
- Copelatus brivioi Rocchi, 1976
- Copelatus bromeliarum (Scott, 1912)
- Copelatus brullei Aubé, 1838
- Copelatus brunneus J. Balfour-Browne, 1939
- Copelatus buqueti Aubé, 1838
- Copelatus burgeoni Gschwendtner, 1930
- Copelatus caelatipennis Aubé, 1838
- Copelatus caelatus Guignot, 1952
- Copelatus caffer J. Balfour-Browne, 1939
- Copelatus calaquei Bilardo & Rocchi, 2008
- Copelatus camerunensis Guignot, 1941
- Copelatus capensis Sharp, 1882
- Copelatus carayoni Legros, 1949
- Copelatus carinatus Sharp, 1882
- Copelatus celinoides Guignot, 1952
- Copelatus cessaima Caetano, Bená & Vanin, 2013
- Copelatus chevrolati Aubé, 1838 NA
- Copelatus chibcha Guignot, 1952
- Copelatus chinensis Régimbart, 1899
- Copelatus chipiriricus Guignot, 1957
- Copelatus chloroticus Régimbart, 1899
- Copelatus cinnamomeus Régimbart, 1895
- Copelatus clarki Sharp, 1882
- Copelatus collarti Gschwendtner, 1932
- Copelatus compertus Guignot, 1956
- Copelatus concii Bilardo, 1982
- Copelatus concolor Sharp, 1882
- Copelatus concolorans J. Balfour-Browne, 1939
- Copelatus confinis Bilardo & Rocchi, 1999
- Copelatus congo Gschwendtner, 1938
- Copelatus consimilis Bilardo & Rocchi, 2002
- Copelatus consors Sharp, 1882
- †Copelatus convexus (Förster, 1891)
- Copelatus cooperae Bilardo & Pederzani, 1972
- Copelatus cordovai Megna & Epler, 2012
- Copelatus cordylinoides J. Balfour-Browne, 1938
- Copelatus coxalis Sharp, 1882
- Copelatus crassus Régimbart, 1895
- Copelatus cryptarchoides Régimbart, 1899
- Copelatus cubaensis Schaeffer, 1908
- Copelatus curtistriatus Bilardo & Rocchi, 1995
- Copelatus curvispinis Bilardo & Rocchi, 2008
- Copelatus cynthiae Bilardo & Rocchi, 2008
- Copelatus daemeli Sharp, 1882
- Copelatus danyi Megna & Epler, 2012
- Copelatus darlingtoni Young, 1942
- Copelatus davidi Wewalka, 2017
- Copelatus debilis Sharp, 1882
- Copelatus deccanensis Sheth, Ghate & Hájek, 2018
- Copelatus decellei Bilardo, 1982
- Copelatus decemsulcatus Régimbart, 1895
- Copelatus deceptor Bilardo & Rocchi, 1995
- Copelatus dentatipenis Jiang, Hájek & Jia, 2022
- Copelatus depressus Sharp, 1882
- Copelatus descarpentriesi Bertrand & Legros, 1975
- Copelatus diffisus Guignot, 1939
- Copelatus dimorphus Sharp, 1882
- Copelatus distinctus Aubé, 1838
- Copelatus distinguendus Régimbart, 1903
- Copelatus diversistriatus Jiang, Hájek & Jia, 2022
- Copelatus djiboutensis Wewalka & Jäch, 2017
- Copelatus dolosus Guignot, 1956
- Copelatus doriae Sharp, 1882
- Copelatus doudouensis Bilardo & Rocchi, 2015
- Copelatus duodecimstriatus Aubé, 1838
- Copelatus duponti Aubé, 1838
- Copelatus efoutensis Bilardo & Rocchi, 1995
- Copelatus ejactus Omer-Cooper, 1965
- Copelatus ellai Bilardo & Rocchi, 1995
- Copelatus elutus Guignot, 1958
- Copelatus enganensis Guignot, 1940
- Copelatus epactus Guignot, 1948
- Copelatus erichsonii Guérin-Méneville, 1847
- Copelatus esteriensis Bilardo & Pederzani, 1978
- Copelatus eucritus Guignot, 1952
- Copelatus evanidus Bilardo & Rocchi, 1995
- Copelatus exaratus Sharp, 1882
- Copelatus externus Kirsch, 1873
- Copelatus falciformis Pederzani & Schizzerotto, 2017
- Copelatus fasciatus Bilardo & Rocchi, 1995
- Copelatus fastidiosus Guignot, 1959
- Copelatus feae Régimbart, 1888
- Copelatus felicis Hájek, Jiang & Jia, 2022
- Copelatus fernandensis Guignot, 1952
- Copelatus ferruginicollis Régimbart, 1895
- Copelatus ferus Guignot, 1953
- Copelatus festae Régimbart, 1899
- Copelatus fidschiensis Zimmermann, 1928
- Copelatus fijiensis Guignot, 1955
- Copelatus filiformis Sharp, 1882
- Copelatus fizpaci Bilardo & Rocchi, 2013
- Copelatus flavicans Guignot, 1952
- Copelatus flavidus Régimbart, 1895
- Copelatus fluviaticus Guignot, 1957
- Copelatus fontanus J. Balfour-Browne, 1950
- †Copelatus fossilis Říha, 1974
- Copelatus fractistriatus Bilardo & Rocchi, 1995
- Copelatus freudei Guignot, 1955
- Copelatus fryi J. Balfour-Browne, 1939
- Copelatus fulviceps J. Balfour-Browne, 1938
- Copelatus fuscipennis Sharp, 1882
- Copelatus fuscomaculatus Guignot, 1952
- Copelatus gabonicus Bilardo & Pederzani, 1978
- Copelatus galapagoensis G.R. Waterhouse, 1845
- Copelatus garambanus Guignot, 1955
- Copelatus gardineri Scott, 1912
- Copelatus geayi Régimbart, 1904
- Copelatus geniculatus Sharp, 1882
- Copelatus gentilis Sharp, 1882
- Copelatus gestroi (Sharp, 1882)
- Copelatus gigas Bilardo & Rocchi, 2019
- Copelatus glyphicus (Say, 1823) NA
- Copelatus griffinii Régimbart, 1899
- Copelatus gschwendtneri Guignot, 1939
- Copelatus guadelupensis Legros, 1948
- Copelatus guerini Aubé, 1838
- Copelatus guineensis Guignot, 1955
- Copelatus haemorrhoidalis Régimbart, 1883
- Copelatus hararensis Guignot, 1952
- Copelatus hardenbergi J. Balfour-Browne, 1950
- Copelatus hebeter Guignot, 1953
- Copelatus heterogynus Régimbart, 1899
- Copelatus hydroporoides (Murray, 1859)
- Copelatus ibrahimi Zalat, Saleh, Angus & Kaschef, 2000
- Copelatus ignacioi Hájek, Hendrich & Balke, 2022
- Copelatus iguelaensis Bilardo & Rocchi, 2002
- Copelatus ilybioides Régimbart, 1895
- Copelatus imitator Bilardo & Rocchi, 2002
- Copelatus inaequalis Sharp, 1882
- Copelatus incognitus Sharp, 1882
- Copelatus indicus Sharp, 1882
- Copelatus inopinatus Bilardo & Rocchi, 1995
- Copelatus inornatus Sharp, 1882
- Copelatus insidiosus Bilardo & Rocchi, 1995
- Copelatus insolitus Chevrolat, 1863
- Copelatus instabilis Régimbart, 1897
- Copelatus instriatus Zimmermann, 1921
- Copelatus insuetus Guignot, 1941
- Copelatus insulanus Guignot, 1939
- Copelatus integer Sharp, 1882
- Copelatus internus Régimbart, 1904
- Copelatus interstriatus J. Balfour-Browne, 1939
- Copelatus inuber Guignot, 1952
- Copelatus ipiformis Régimbart, 1895
- Copelatus irinus Régimbart, 1899
- Copelatus irregularis W.J. Macleay, 1871
- Copelatus ischius Guignot, 1956
- Copelatus jactator Guignot, 1955
- Copelatus jaechi Bilardo & Rocchi, 2016
- Copelatus jamaicensis Young, 1942
- Copelatus japonicus Sharp, 1884
- Copelatus jarrigei Legros, 1954
- Copelatus javanus Régimbart, 1883
- Copelatus jocosus Guignot, 1955
- Copelatus johannis Guignot, 1954
- Copelatus kalaharii Gschwendtner, 1935
- Copelatus kammuriensis Tamu & Tsukamoto, 1955
- Copelatus kaszabi Guignot, 1956
- Copelatus kely Ranarilalatiana & Bergsten, 2019
- Copelatus kietensis Hájek, Shaverdo, Hendrich & Balke, 2021
- Copelatus kilimandjarensis Bilardo & Pederzani, 1972
- Copelatus kindianus Guignot, 1954
- Copelatus kongouensis Bilardo & Rocchi, 1999
- Copelatus koreanus T. Mori, 1932
- Copelatus laccophilinus Sharp, 1882
- Copelatus laeticulus Sharp, 1882
- Copelatus laevipennis Hájek, Shaverdo, Hendrich & Balke, 2021
- Copelatus lamottei Legros, 1954
- Copelatus lanzai Bilardo & Rocchi, 1995
- Copelatus laraensis Bilardo & Rocchi, 1995
- Copelatus lasckonyi Bilardo & Rocchi, 1995
- Copelatus latens Guignot, 1952
- Copelatus laticollis Régimbart, 1899
- Copelatus latifasciatus Bilardo & Rocchi, 1999
- Copelatus latipes Sharp, 1882
- Copelatus latus J. Balfour-Browne, 1950
- Copelatus leonardii Bilardo & Rocchi, 1999
- Copelatus leonensis Legros, 1954
- Copelatus lepersonneae Gschwendtner, 1943
- Copelatus lignosus Guignot, 1955
- Copelatus lineatipennis Guignot, 1955
- Copelatus lineatus (Guérin-Méneville, 1838)
- Copelatus longicornis Sharp, 1882
- Copelatus lootensi Guignot, 1955
- Copelatus louayensis Bilardo & Rocchi, 2004
- Copelatus luctuosus Guignot, 1939
- Copelatus luridescens Régimbart, 1889
- Copelatus luteocinctus Guignot, 1955
- Copelatus luteomaculatus Guignot, 1956
- Copelatus luzonicus Guignot, 1952
- Copelatus macellus Guignot, 1950
- Copelatus madoni Guignot, 1952
- Copelatus mahajanga Pederzani & Hájek, 2005
- Copelatus mahleri Holmen & Vazirani, 1990
- Copelatus makokouensis Bilardo & Rocchi, 1995
- Copelatus malaisei Guignot, 1954
- Copelatus malavergnorum Manuel & Ramahandrison, 2022
- Copelatus mancus Sharp, 1887
- Copelatus marginatus Sharp, 1882
- Copelatus marginipennis (Laporte, 1835)
- Copelatus martinbaehri Hendrich, Shaverdo, Hájek & Balke, 2019
- Copelatus martini Manuel, Deler-Hernández, Megna & Hájek, 2018
- Copelatus masculinus Régimbart, 1899
- Copelatus massaicus Guignot, 1941
- Copelatus mathani Guignot, 1952
- Copelatus maushomi Sheth, Ghate & Hájek, 2018
- Copelatus mbokoensis Bilardo & Rocchi, 2006
- Copelatus melanogrammus Régimbart, 1883
- Copelatus mendax Bilardo & Rocchi, 2011
- Copelatus miaowangi Hájek, Jiang & Jia, 2022
- Copelatus minimus Bilardo & Rocchi, 1995
- Copelatus minor Bilardo & Pederzani, 1978
- Copelatus minutissimus J. Balfour-Browne, 1939
- Copelatus mkambati Bilton & Mlambo, 2022
- Copelatus mocquerysi Régimbart, 1895
- Copelatus mohelicus Guignot, 1959
- Copelatus monticola Guignot, 1951
- Copelatus montivagus Young, 1942
- Copelatus mopanshanensis Jiang, Zhao & Hájek, 2022
- Copelatus mulangensis Bameul, 2003
- Copelatus mundus Sharp, 1882
- Copelatus mutabilis Bilardo & Rocchi, 1999
- Copelatus mvoungensis Bilardo & Rocchi, 2004
- Copelatus mysorensis Vazirani, 1970
- Copelatus nakamurai Guéorguiev, 1970
- Copelatus nangaensis Guignot, 1952
- Copelatus nanlingensis Hájek, Jiang & Jia, 2022
- Copelatus nauclerus Guignot, 1939
- Copelatus neavei J. Balfour-Browne, 1950
- Copelatus neelumae Vazirani, 1973
- Copelatus neogestroi Balke, 2008
- Copelatus neoguineensis Zimmermann, 1919
- Copelatus nguemai Bilardo & Rocchi, 2011
- Copelatus nigricans Sharp, 1882
- Copelatus nigrolineatus Sharp, 1882
- Copelatus nigropennis Zimmermann, 1927
- Copelatus nigrostriatus Régimbart, 1895
- Copelatus nilssoni Wewalka, 1982
- Copelatus nimbaensis Legros, 1958
- Copelatus nitens Bilardo & Rocchi, 1999
- Copelatus nitidus Sharp, 1882
- Copelatus nodieri Régimbart, 1895
- Copelatus normalis Erichson, 1847
- Copelatus notius Omer-Cooper, 1965
- Copelatus nzei Bilardo & Rocchi, 1999
- Copelatus oblitus Sharp, 1882
- Copelatus obscurus Sharp, 1882
- Copelatus occultus Bilardo & Rocchi, 1995
- Copelatus ogasawarensis Kamiya, 1932
- Copelatus onorei Pederzani & Rocchi, 1982
- Copelatus ornatipennis Zimmermann, 1926
- Copelatus owas Régimbart, 1895
- Copelatus pachys Guignot, 1955
- Copelatus pallidus Régimbart, 1895
- Copelatus paludorum Guignot, 1952
- Copelatus pandanorum Scott, 1912
- Copelatus pantosi Guignot, 1958
- Copelatus papuensis J. Balfour-Browne, 1939
- Copelatus parabaptus Guignot, 1955
- Copelatus parallelipipedus Régimbart, 1895
- Copelatus parallelus Zimmermann, 1920
- Copelatus pardii Rocchi, 1990
- Copelatus parisii Guignot, 1959
- Copelatus parumstriatus Gschwendtner, 1934
- Copelatus paryphes Guignot, 1955
- Copelatus pederzanii Bilardo & Rocchi, 1995
- Copelatus pereirai Guignot, 1955
- Copelatus peridinus Guignot, 1955
- Copelatus pinnifer Guignot, 1952
- Copelatus piriensis Omer-Cooper, 1965
- Copelatus platynotus Régimbart, 1895
- Copelatus polystrigus Sharp, 1882
- †Copelatus ponomarenkoi Říha, 1974
- Copelatus portior Guignot, 1956
- Copelatus posticatus (Fabricius, 1801)
- Copelatus poungai Bilardo & Rocchi, 2006
- †Copelatus predaveterus K.B. Miller, 2003
- Copelatus prolixus Sharp, 1882
- Copelatus prolongatus Sharp, 1882
- Copelatus propino Guignot, 1960
- Copelatus propinquus Régimbart, 1895
- Copelatus proximus Sharp, 1882
- Copelatus pseudostriatus Ranarilalatiana & Bergsten, 2019
- Copelatus pulchellus (Klug, 1834)
- Copelatus pulicarius Régimbart, 1895
- Copelatus pumilus Régimbart, 1895
- Copelatus punctatus Bilardo & Rocchi, 1995
- Copelatus punctulatus Aubé, 1838 NA
- Copelatus puzhelongi Jiang, Hájek & Jia, 2022
- Copelatus quadrisignatus Régimbart, 1877
- Copelatus quadristriatus Pederzani & Schizzerotto, 2017
- Copelatus racenisi Guignot, 1951
- Copelatus ragazzii Régimbart, 1887
- Copelatus regimbarti Branden, 1884
- Copelatus restrictus Sharp, 1882
- Copelatus rimosus Guignot, 1952
- Copelatus rivalis Guignot, 1952
- Copelatus rocchii Bilardo, 1982
- Copelatus romani Zimmermann, 1924
- Copelatus rosulae Hájek, Jiang & Jia, 2022
- Copelatus royi Legros, 1958
- Copelatus rubiginosus Guignot, 1954
- Copelatus ruficapillus Régimbart, 1895
- Copelatus ruteri Legros, 1954
- Copelatus saegeri Guignot, 1955
- Copelatus safiotra Ranarilalatiana & Bergsten, 2019
- Copelatus sahlbergi J. Balfour-Browne, 1939
- Copelatus sallaei Sharp, 1882
- Copelatus sanfilippoi Bilardo & Pederzani, 1972
- Copelatus saverii Pederzani & Schizzerotto, 2017
- Copelatus scalptus Guignot, 1954
- Copelatus scaphites Guignot, 1955
- Copelatus schaefferi Young, 1942
- Copelatus schereri Wewalka, 1981
- Copelatus schuhi Hendrich & Balke, 1998
- Copelatus scutatus Guignot, 1952
- Copelatus scytalotus Guignot, 1956
- Copelatus senegalensis Lagar & Hernando, 1991
- Copelatus sexstriatus Sharp, 1882
- Copelatus sharpi Branden, 1884
- Copelatus sibelaemontis Hájek, Hendrich, Hawlitschek & Balke, 2010
- Copelatus silvestrii Régimbart, 1903
- Copelatus simoni Régimbart, 1889
- Copelatus singularis Bilardo & Rocchi, 1995
- Copelatus sociennus J. Balfour-Browne, 1952
- Copelatus solitarius Sharp, 1882
- Copelatus sordidipennis Régimbart, 1895
- Copelatus speciosus Régimbart, 1892
- Copelatus spoliatus Guignot, 1955
- †Copelatus stavropolitanus Říha, 1974
- Copelatus stillicidicola Bilardo & Rocchi, 1995
- Copelatus striatellus Boheman, 1848
- Copelatus striaticollis Lucas, 1857
- Copelatus striatopterus Aubé, 1838
- Copelatus striatulus Aubé, 1838
- Copelatus strigipennis (Laporte, 1835)
- Copelatus strigosulus (Fairmaire, 1878)
- Copelatus strinatii Guignot, 1958
- Copelatus striolatus Peschet, 1917
- Copelatus stygis Guignot, 1958
- Copelatus subdeficiens Régimbart, 1902
- Copelatus subsimilis Guignot, 1958
- Copelatus substriatus Kirsch, 1873
- Copelatus subterraneus Guéorguiev, 1978
- Copelatus sudrei Bameul, 2003
- Copelatus sulcatus Sharp, 1882
- Copelatus sulcipennis (Laporte, 1835)
- Copelatus sumbawensis Régimbart, 1899
- Copelatus suppar Guignot, 1956
- Copelatus supplementaris Régimbart, 1895
- Copelatus sylvaticoides Bilardo & Rocchi, 2013
- Copelatus sylvaticus Guignot, 1952
- Copelatus takakurai Satô, 1985
- Copelatus tanaus Guignot, 1953
- Copelatus taprobanicus Wewalka & Vazirani, 1985
- Copelatus tenebrosus Régimbart, 1880
- Copelatus tengchongensis Hájek, Jiang & Jia, 2022
- Copelatus teranishii Kamiya, 1938
- Copelatus terminalis Sharp, 1882
- Copelatus ternatensis Régimbart, 1899
- Copelatus terzanii Bilardo & Rocchi, 2016
- Copelatus thiriouxi Peschet, 1917
- Copelatus thrasys Guignot, 1952
- Copelatus tibialis Sharp, 1882
- Copelatus tinctor Guignot, 1954
- Copelatus togoensis Régimbart, 1895
- Copelatus tomokunii Satô, 1985
- Copelatus tondangoyei Bilardo & Rocchi, 2013
- Copelatus tostus J. Balfour-Browne, 1950
- Copelatus trifilis Guignot, 1958
- Copelatus triglyphus Guignot, 1955
- Copelatus trilobatus Régimbart, 1895
- Copelatus tschaga Bilardo & Pederzani, 1972
- Copelatus tucuchiensis J. Balfour-Browne, 1939
- Copelatus tulagicus Guignot, 1942
- Copelatus uludanuensis Hendrich & Balke, 1995
- Copelatus undecimstriatus Aubé, 1838
- Copelatus urceolus Hájek, Shaverdo, Hendrich & Balke, 2021
- Copelatus usagarensis Zimmermann, 1926
- Copelatus vagatus Guignot, 1952
- Copelatus vagestriatus Zimmermann, 1919
- Copelatus vagus Bilardo & Rocchi, 1995
- Copelatus validus Sharp, 1882
- Copelatus vancli Hájek, Hendrich & Balke, 2018
- Copelatus vanninii Bilardo & Rocchi, 1999
- Copelatus variegatus Régimbart, 1895
- Copelatus variistriatus Hájek, Shaverdo, Hendrich & Balke, 2021
- Copelatus venustus Bilardo & Rocchi, 1995
- Copelatus vigintistriatus Fairmaire, 1869
- Copelatus vigintisulcatus Régimbart, 1895
- Copelatus villiersi Guignot, 1950
- Copelatus virungaensis Bilardo, 1982
- Copelatus vitraci Legros, 1948
- Copelatus vivax Guignot, 1953
- Copelatus vokoka Ranarilalatiana & Bergsten, 2019
- Copelatus wallacei J. Balfour-Browne, 1939
- Copelatus waltoni J. Balfour-Browne, 1950
- Copelatus wayanadensis Manivannan & Madani, 2011
- Copelatus wewalkai Holmen & Vazirani, 1990
- Copelatus weymarni J. Balfour-Browne, 1947
- Copelatus xanthocephalus Régimbart, 1899
- Copelatus xiniudong Jiang, Hájek & Jia, 2022
- Copelatus yacumensis Guignot, 1957
- Copelatus yaguarete Scheers, 2018
- Copelatus yombensis Bilardo & Rocchi, 2015
- Copelatus zadiensis Bilardo & Rocchi, 1995
- Copelatus zanabato Manuel & Ramahandrison, 2022
- Copelatus zanatanensis Ranarilalatiana & Bergsten, 2019
- Copelatus zimmermanni Gschwendtner, 1934
