= Copelatus restrictus =

Scientific classification
- Kingdom: Animalia
- Phylum: Arthropoda
- Class: Insecta
- Order: Coleoptera
- Suborder: Adephaga
- Family: Dytiscidae
- Genus: Copelatus
- Species: C. restrictus

Binomial name
- Copelatus restrictus Sharp, 1882

Species of beetle

Copelatus restrictus is a species of diving beetle. It is part of the genus Copelatus in the subfamily Copelatinae of the family Dytiscidae. It was described by Sharp in 1882.

Its type locality is Montevideo.
