= Copelatus barbouri =

Scientific classification
- Domain: Eukaryota
- Kingdom: Animalia
- Phylum: Arthropoda
- Class: Insecta
- Order: Coleoptera
- Suborder: Adephaga
- Family: Dytiscidae
- Genus: Copelatus
- Species: C. barbouri

Binomial name
- Copelatus barbouri Young, 1942

Species of beetle

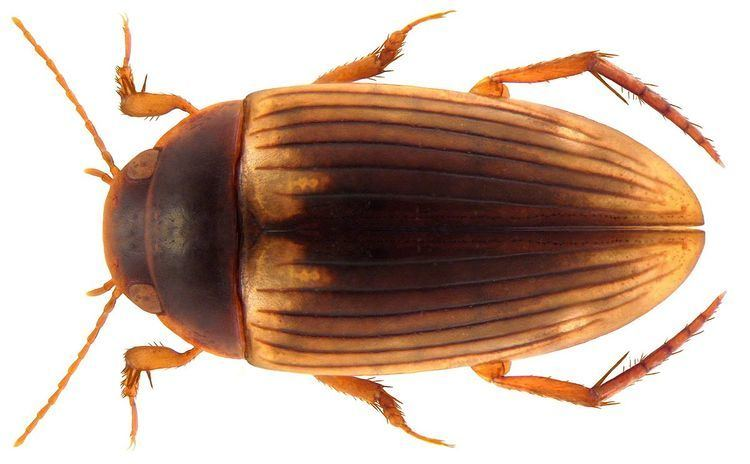
A Copelatus Barbouri from a top down angle.

Copelatus barbouri is a species of diving beetle. It is part of the genus Copelatus in the subfamily Copelatinae of the family Dytiscidae. It was described in Cuba by Young in 1942.
