= Copelatus lineatus =

Scientific classification
- Kingdom: Animalia
- Phylum: Arthropoda
- Clade: Pancrustacea
- Class: Insecta
- Order: Coleoptera
- Suborder: Adephaga
- Family: Dytiscidae
- Genus: Copelatus
- Species: C. lineatus

Binomial name
- Copelatus lineatus (Guérin-Méneville, 1838)

Species of beetle

Copelatus lineatus is a species of diving beetle. It is part of the genus Copelatus in the subfamily Copelatinae of the family Dytiscidae. It was described by Félix Édouard Guérin-Méneville in 1838.
