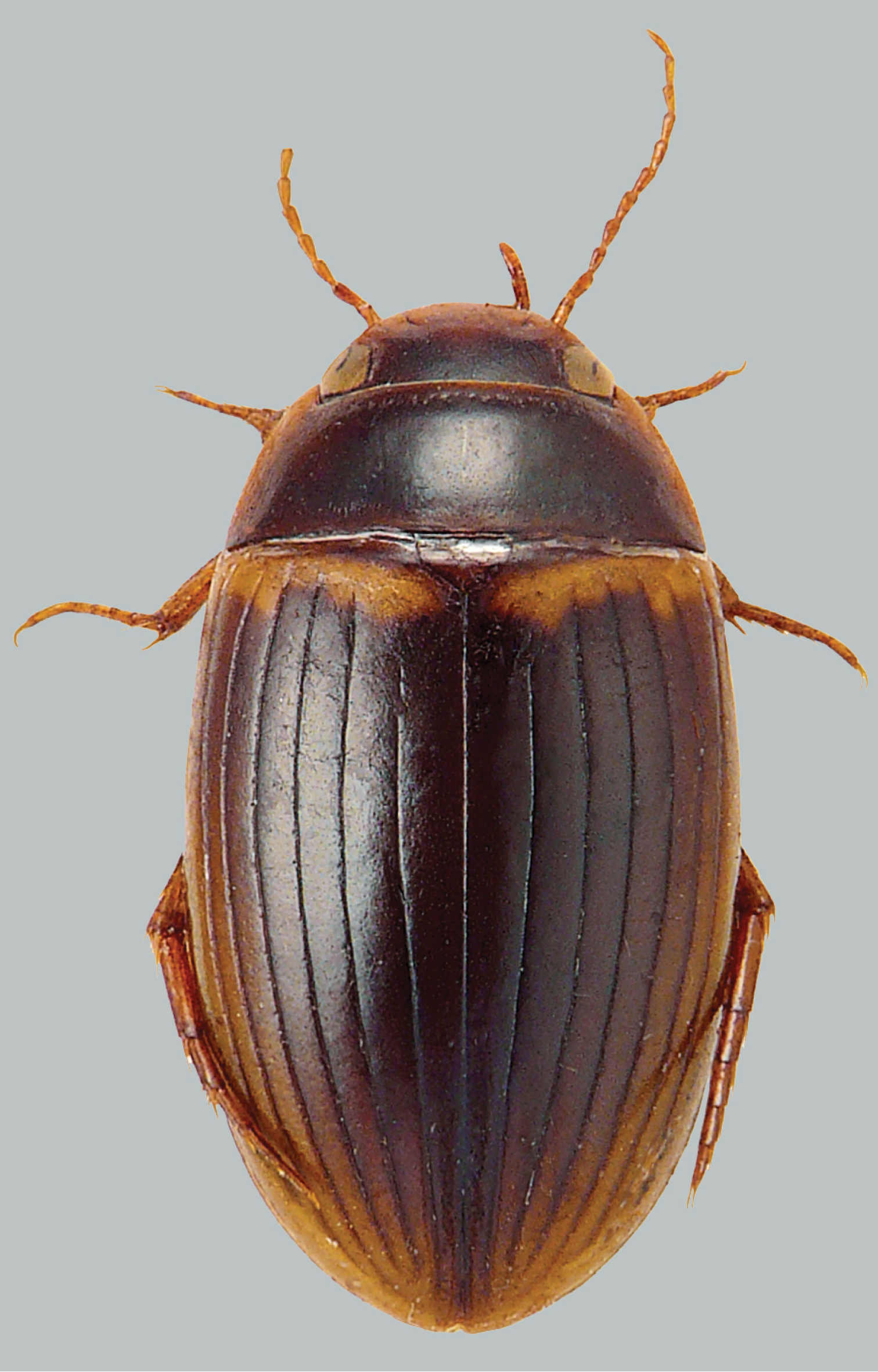

Scientific classification
- Domain: Eukaryota
- Kingdom: Animalia
- Phylum: Arthropoda
- Class: Insecta
- Order: Coleoptera
- Suborder: Adephaga
- Family: Dytiscidae
- Genus: Copelatus
- Species: C. portior

Binomial name
- Copelatus portior Guignot, 1956

Synonyms
- Copelatus divisus Watts, 1978

= Copelatus portior =

Species of beetle

Copelatus portior is a species of diving beetle. It is part of the genus Copelatus in the subfamily Copelatinae of the family Dytiscidae. It was described by Félix Guignot in 1956.
