= Copelatus subsimilis =

Scientific classification
- Kingdom: Animalia
- Phylum: Arthropoda
- Class: Insecta
- Order: Coleoptera
- Suborder: Adephaga
- Family: Dytiscidae
- Genus: Copelatus
- Species: C. subsimilis

Binomial name
- Copelatus subsimilis Guignot, 1958

Species of beetle

Copelatus subsimilis is a species of diving beetle in the subfamily Copelatinae of the family Dytiscidae, described by Félix Guignot in 1958.
