= Copelatus bengalensis =

Scientific classification
- Kingdom: Animalia
- Phylum: Arthropoda
- Class: Insecta
- Order: Coleoptera
- Suborder: Adephaga
- Family: Dytiscidae
- Genus: Copelatus
- Species: C. bengalensis

Binomial name
- Copelatus bengalensis Guignot, 1955

Species of beetle

Copelatus bengalensis is a species of diving beetle, and is part of the genus Copelatus in the subfamily Copelatinae of the family Dytiscidae. It was described by Félix Guignot in 1955.
