= Antiporus mcraeae =

Scientific classification
- Kingdom: Animalia
- Phylum: Arthropoda
- Clade: Pancrustacea
- Class: Insecta
- Order: Coleoptera
- Suborder: Adephaga
- Family: Dytiscidae
- Genus: Antiporus
- Species: A. mcraeae

Binomial name
- Antiporus mcraeae Watts & Pinder, 1997
- Holotype site (WAM E26607

Species of beetle

Antiporus mcraeae is a predaceous diving beetle in the family Antiporus, first described in 2000 by Chris H.S. Watts & Pinder.

It is known only from its type locality in the Wheat Belt of Western Australia.
