= Copelatus celinoides =

Copelatus celinoides Temporal range: Eocene - present

Scientific classification
- Kingdom: Animalia
- Phylum: Arthropoda
- Class: Insecta
- Order: Coleoptera
- Suborder: Adephaga
- Family: Dytiscidae
- Genus: Copelatus
- Species: C. celinoides

Binomial name
- Copelatus celinoides Guignot, 1952

Species of beetle

Copelatus celinoides is a species of diving beetle. It is part of the genus Copelatus in the subfamily Copelatinae of the family Dytiscidae. It was described by Guignot in 1952.
