= Leiodytes =

Scientific classification
- Kingdom: Animalia
- Phylum: Arthropoda
- Class: Insecta
- Order: Coleoptera
- Suborder: Adephaga
- Family: Dytiscidae
- Genus: Leiodytes; Guignot, 1936

Genus of beetles

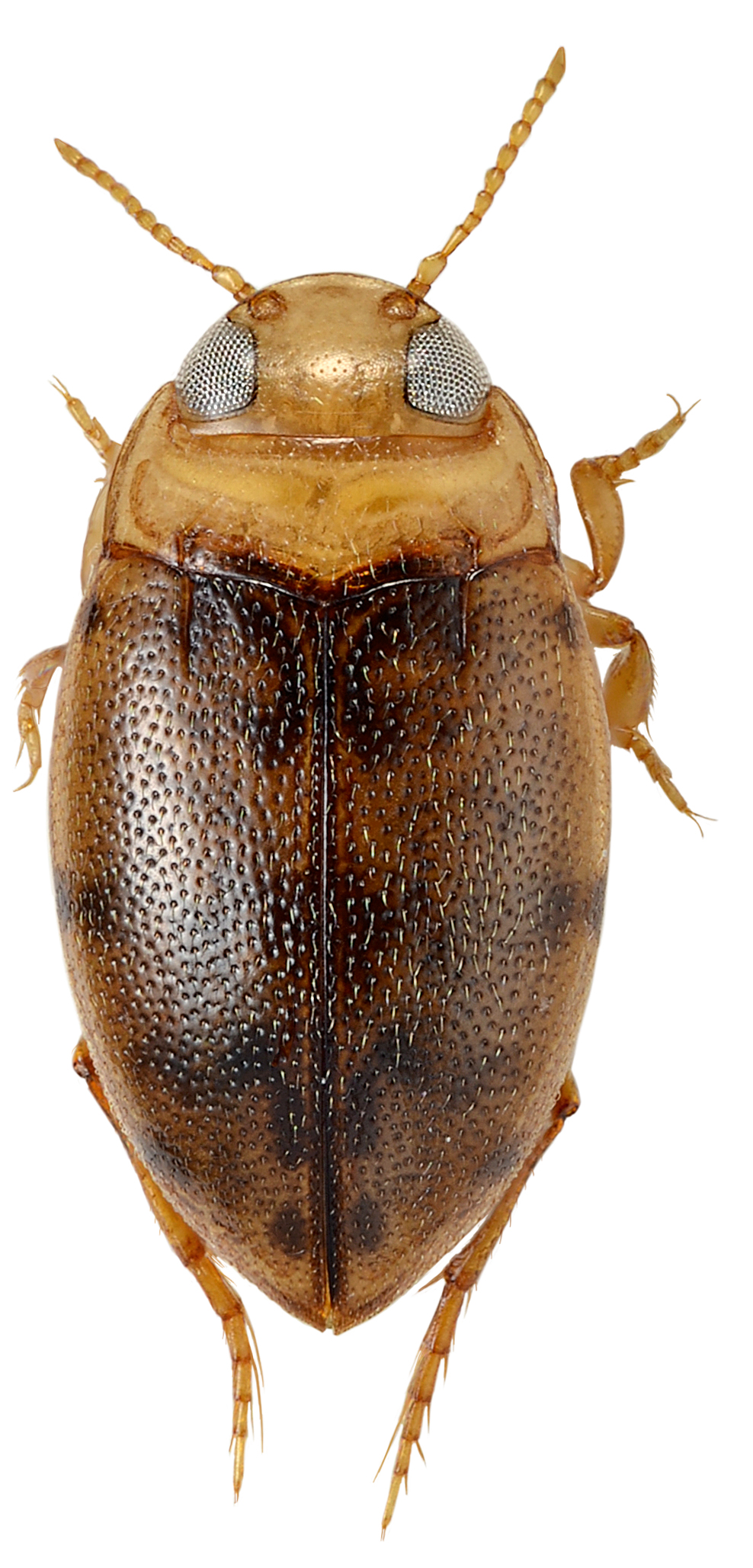
Leiodytes nicobaricus, found in Thailand.

Leiodytes is a genus of beetles in the family Dytiscidae, containing the following species:

- Leiodytes acutus Wang, Satô & P.-S.Yang, 1998
- Leiodytes atomus (Régimbart, 1877)
- Leiodytes australis Biström, 1987
- Leiodytes bicolor (Biström, 1988)
- Leiodytes camerunensis Biström, 1987
- Leiodytes demoulini (Guignot, 1955)
- Leiodytes evanescens (Boheman, 1848)
- Leiodytes frontalis (Sharp, 1884)
- Leiodytes gracilis (Gschwendtner, 1933)
- Leiodytes griseoguttatus (Régimbart, 1893)
- Leiodytes guttulatus (Régimbart, 1891)
- Leiodytes hieroglyphicus (Régimbart, 1894)
- Leiodytes horai (Vazirani, 1969)
- Leiodytes imitator Biström, 1987
- Leiodytes indicus (Régimbart, 1892)
- Leiodytes javanus (Régimbart, 1899)
- Leiodytes kyushuensis (Nakane, 1990)
- Leiodytes lanyuensis Wang, Satô & P.-S.Yang, 1998
- Leiodytes marginicollis (Régimbart, 1895)
- Leiodytes minutus (Vazirani, 1969)
- Leiodytes miyamotoi (Nakane, 1990)
- Leiodytes nicobaricus (Redtenbacher, 1867)
- Leiodytes oblongus (Régimbart, 1899)
- Leiodytes orissaensis (Vazirani, 1969)
- Leiodytes perforatus (Sharp, 1882)
- Leiodytes regimbarti (Guignot, 1936)
- Leiodytes similis Biström, 1993
- Leiodytes vietnamensis Wang, Satô & P.-S.Yang, 1998
