= Antiporus willyamsi =

Scientific classification
- Kingdom: Animalia
- Phylum: Arthropoda
- Class: Insecta
- Order: Coleoptera
- Suborder: Adephaga
- Family: Dytiscidae
- Genus: Antiporus
- Species: A. willyamsi

Binomial name
- Antiporus willyamsi Watts, 1997
- Holotype site (SAMA 25-000264)

Species of beetle

Antiporus willyamsi is a predaceous diving beetle in the family Antiporus, first described in 1997 by Chris H.S. Watts.

It is found only in Australia, in the drainage basins and coastal and oceanic zones of Victoria, and South Australia, with the type specimen collected in 1983 10 km south of Robe, South Australia.
