= Antiporus jenniferae =

Scientific classification
- Kingdom: Animalia
- Phylum: Arthropoda
- Clade: Pancrustacea
- Class: Insecta
- Order: Coleoptera
- Suborder: Adephaga
- Family: Dytiscidae
- Genus: Antiporus
- Species: A. jenniferae

Binomial name
- Antiporus jenniferae Watts, 1997
- Holotype site (SAMA 25-000261)

Species of beetle

Antiporus jenniferae is a predaceous diving beetle in the family Antiporus, first described in 1997 by Chris H.S. Watts.

It is found only in Australia: in Queensland, the Northern Territory and Western Australia, with the type specimen collected in 1984 25 km north of Coen, Queensland.
