= Copelatus chibcha =

Scientific classification
- Kingdom: Animalia
- Phylum: Arthropoda
- Class: Insecta
- Order: Coleoptera
- Suborder: Adephaga
- Family: Dytiscidae
- Genus: Copelatus
- Species: C. chibcha

Binomial name
- Copelatus chibcha Guignot, 1952

Species of beetle

Copelatus chibcha is a species of diving beetle. It is part of the genus Copelatus of the subfamily Copelatinae in the family Dytiscidae. It was described by Guignot in 1952.
