= Antiporus pennifoldae =

Scientific classification
- Kingdom: Animalia
- Phylum: Arthropoda
- Clade: Pancrustacea
- Class: Insecta
- Order: Coleoptera
- Suborder: Adephaga
- Family: Dytiscidae
- Genus: Antiporus
- Species: A. pennifoldae

Binomial name
- Antiporus pennifoldae Watts & Pinder, 2000
- Holotype site (WAM 26606

Species of beetle

Antiporus pennifoldae is a predaceous diving beetle in the family Antiporus, first described in 2000 by Chris H.S. Watts & Pinder.

It is known only from its type locality in a peat swamp of Lake Poorginup (Poorginup Swamp) in Western Australia.
