= Copelatus thrasys =

Scientific classification
- Domain: Eukaryota
- Kingdom: Animalia
- Phylum: Arthropoda
- Class: Insecta
- Order: Coleoptera
- Suborder: Adephaga
- Family: Dytiscidae
- Genus: Copelatus
- Species: C. thrasys

Binomial name
- Copelatus thrasys Guignot, 1952

Species of beetle

Copelatus thrasys is a species of diving beetle. It is part of the genus Copelatus of the subfamily Copelatinae in the family Dytiscidae.
