= Paroster =

Scientific classification
- Kingdom: Animalia
- Phylum: Arthropoda
- Class: Insecta
- Order: Coleoptera
- Suborder: Adephaga
- Family: Dytiscidae
- Tribe: Hydroporini
- Genus: Paroster; Sharp, 1882

Synonyms
- Terradessus Watts, 1982; Nirripirti Watts & Humphreys, 2001

Genus of beetles

Paroster is a genus of beetles in the family Dytiscidae, containing the following species:

- Paroster couragei Watts, 1978
- Paroster gibbi Watts, 1978
- Paroster insculptilis (Clark, 1862)
- Paroster michaelseni Régimbart, 1908
- Paroster niger Watts, 1978
- Paroster nigroadumbratus (Clark, 1862)
- Paroster pallescens Sharp, 1882
- Paroster sharpi Watts, 1978
- Paroster thapsinus (Guignot, 1955)

together with these (listed as valid by the Australian Faunal Directory):

- Paroster anophthalmus (Brancucci & Monteith, 1997)
- Paroster arachnoides (Watts & Humphreys, 2004)
- Paroster baylyi Hendrich & Fery, 2008
- Paroster bulbus (Watts & Humphreys, 2004)
- Paroster byroensis (Watts & Humphreys, 2004)
- Paroster caecus (Watts, 1982)
- Paroster copidotibiae (Watts & Humphreys, 2004)
- Paroster darlotensis (Watts & Humphreys, 2003)
- Paroster dingbatensis (Watts & Humphreys, 2004)
- Paroster eurypleuron (Watts & Humphreys, 2004)
- Paroster extraordinarius Leys, Roudnew & Watts, 2010
- Paroster fortisspina (Watts & Humphreys, 2003
- Paroster hamoni (Watts & Humphreys, 2003)
- Paroster hinzeae (Watts & Humphreys, 2001)
- Paroster innouendyensis (Watts & Humphreys, 2004)
- Paroster killaraensis (Watts & Humphreys, 2003)
- Paroster macrocephalus (Watts & Humphreys, 2003)
- Paroster macrosturtensis (Watts & Humphreys, 2006)
- Paroster megamacrocephalus (Watts & Humphreys, 2006)
- Paroster mesosturtensis (Watts & Humphreys, 2006)
- Paroster microsturtensis (Watts & Humphreys, 2006)
- Paroster milgunensis (Watts & Humphreys, 2003)
- Paroster napperbyensis (Watts & Humphreys, 2003)
- Paroster newhavenensis (Watts & Humphreys, 2003)
- Paroster peelensis Watts, Hancock & Leys, 2008
- Paroster pentameres (Watts & Humphreys, 2003)
- Paroster plutonicensis (Watts & Humpheys, 2003)
- Paroster septum (Watts & Humphreys, 2006)
- Paroster skaphites (Watts & Humphreys, 2003)
- Paroster stegastos (Watts & Humphreys, 2003)
- Paroster tetrameres (Watts & Humphreys, 2006)
- Paroster ursulae Hendrich & Balke, 2008
- Paroster verrucosus (Watts & Humphreys, 2004)
- Paroster wedgeensis (Watts & Humphreys, 2003)
