= Antiporus pembertoni =

Scientific classification
- Kingdom: Animalia
- Phylum: Arthropoda
- Clade: Pancrustacea
- Class: Insecta
- Order: Coleoptera
- Suborder: Adephaga
- Family: Dytiscidae
- Genus: Antiporus
- Species: A. pembertoni

Binomial name
- Antiporus pembertoni Watts, 1997
- Holotype site (SAMA 25-000265)

Species of beetle

Antiporus pembertoni is a predaceous diving beetle in the family Antiporus, first described in 1997 by Chris H.S. Watts.

It is found only in Australia (and known only from its type locality) in Western Australia, with the type specimen having been collected in 1987 15 km north-west of Pemberton, Western Australia.
