= Copelatus pantosi =

Scientific classification
- Kingdom: Animalia
- Phylum: Arthropoda
- Class: Insecta
- Order: Coleoptera
- Suborder: Adephaga
- Family: Dytiscidae
- Genus: Copelatus
- Species: C. pantosi

Binomial name
- Copelatus pantosi Guignot, 1958

Species of beetle

Copelatus pantosi is a species of diving beetle. It is part of the genus Copelatus in the subfamily Copelatinae of the family Dytiscidae. It was described by Félix Guignot in 1958.
