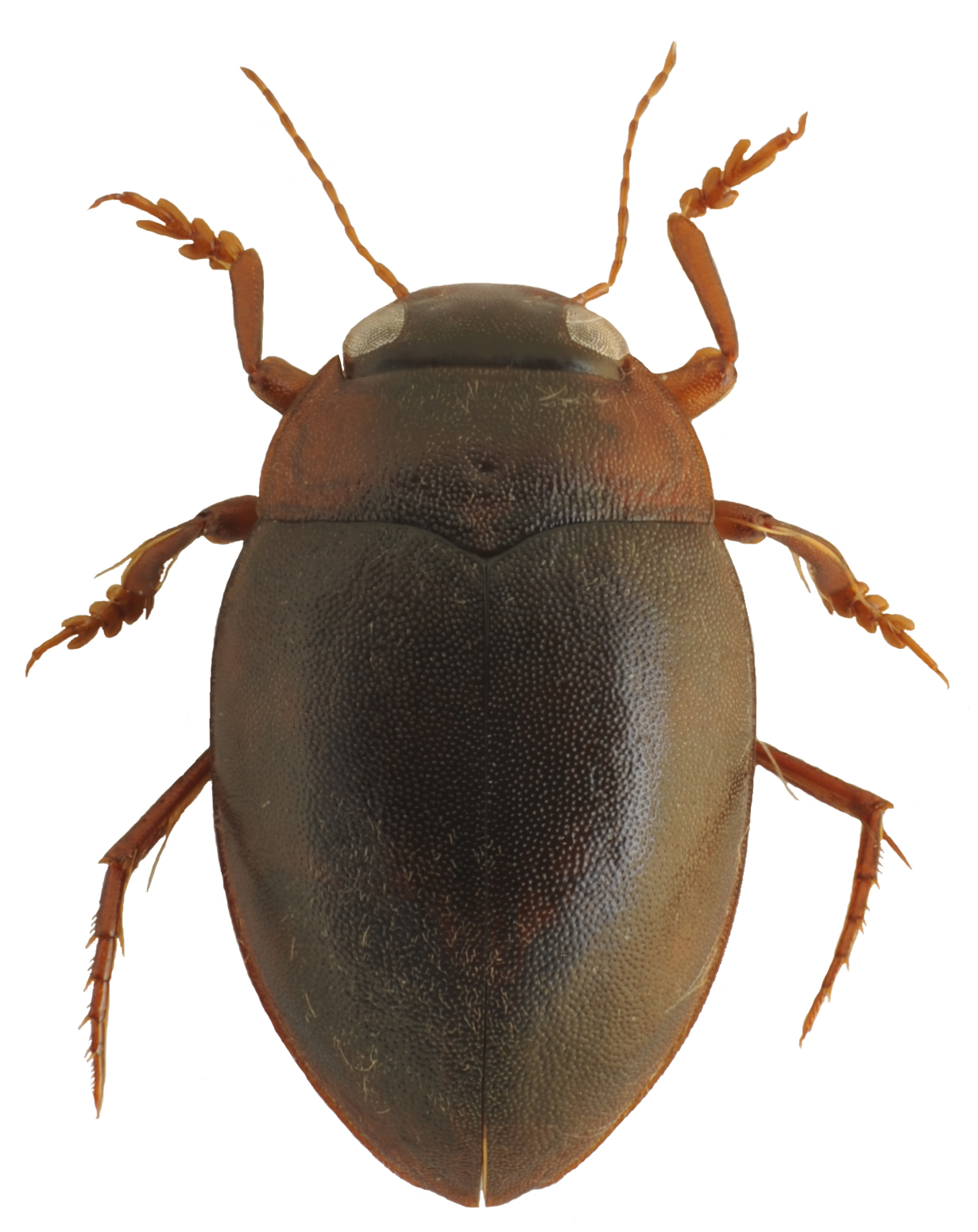

Scientific classification
- Kingdom: Animalia
- Phylum: Arthropoda
- Class: Insecta
- Order: Coleoptera
- Suborder: Adephaga
- Family: Dytiscidae
- Genus: Antiporus
- Species: A. hollingsworthi

Binomial name
- Antiporus hollingsworthi Watts, 1997
- Holotype site ( SAMA 25-000232 Maida Vale, WA)

= Antiporus hollingsworthi =

Species of water beetle

Antiporus hollingsworthi is a species of water beetle in the Scirtidae family, first described in 1997 by Chris Watts.

This species is found in the south-west of Western Australia, in drainage basins.
