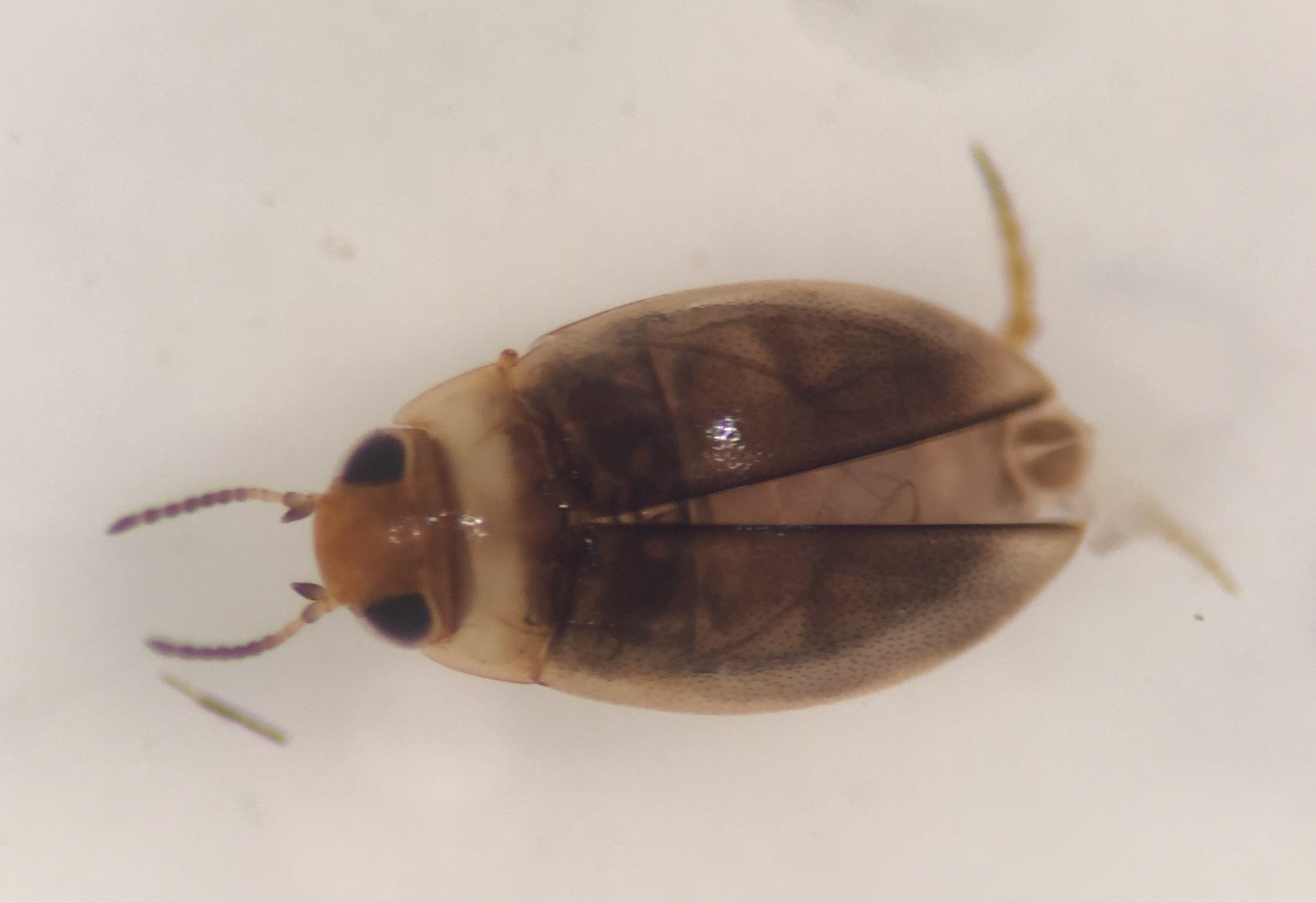
- Uvarus lacustris

Scientific classification
- Kingdom: Animalia
- Phylum: Arthropoda
- Class: Insecta
- Order: Coleoptera
- Suborder: Adephaga
- Family: Dytiscidae
- Tribe: Bidessini
- Genus: Uvarus; Guignot, 1939

= Uvarus =

Genus of beetles

Uvarus is a genus of beetles in the family Dytiscidae, containing the following species:

- Uvarus alluaudi (Régimbart, 1895)
- Uvarus amandus (LeConte, 1852)
- Uvarus andreinii (Régimbart, 1905)
- Uvarus angustulus Biström, 1988
- Uvarus baoulicus (Guignot, 1939)
- Uvarus barombicus Bilardo, 1982
- Uvarus betsimisarakus (Guignot, 1939)
- Uvarus binaghii Pederzani & Sanfilippo, 1978
- Uvarus caprai Pederzani & Sanfilippo, 1978
- Uvarus captiosus (Guignot, 1948)
- Uvarus chappuisi (Peschet, 1932)
- Uvarus costaricensis (Guignot, 1939)
- Uvarus densepunctatus Bilardo & Rocchi, 2002
- Uvarus devroyei (Gschwendtner, 1932)
- Uvarus ejuncidus (Guignot, 1948)
- Uvarus elotus (Guignot, 1942)
- Uvarus falli (Young, 1940)
- Uvarus fastuosus Biström, 1988
- Uvarus flavicans (Régimbart, 1895)
- Uvarus granarius (Aubé, 1838)
- Uvarus ibonum Biström, 1988
- Uvarus infimus (Guignot, 1953)
- Uvarus inflatus (Young, 1950)
- Uvarus lacustris (Say, 1823)
- Uvarus lanzai Pederzani & Rocchi, 1982
- Uvarus laurentius Biström, 1995
- Uvarus limicola Bilardo & Pederzani, 1978
- Uvarus livens (Régimbart, 1892)
- Uvarus lutarius (Guignot, 1939)
- Uvarus magensis (Clark, 1862)
- Uvarus mauritiensis (Régimbart, 1897)
- Uvarus medleri Biström, 1988
- Uvarus miser Bilardo & Pederzani, 1979
- Uvarus nigeriensis Biström, 1988
- Uvarus nubilus (Régimbart, 1895)
- Uvarus omalus Guignot, 1956
- Uvarus omichlodes Guignot, 1957
- Uvarus opacus (Gschwendtner, 1935)
- Uvarus peringueyi (Régimbart, 1895)
- Uvarus pictipes (Lea, 1899)
- Uvarus pinheyi Biström, 2000
- Uvarus poggii Franciscolo & Sanfilippo, 1990
- Uvarus quadrilineatus (Zimmermann, 1923)
- Uvarus quadrimaculatus Bilardo & Rocchi, 1990
- Uvarus retiarius (Guignot, 1939)
- Uvarus rivulorum (Régimbart, 1895)
- Uvarus rogersi (Young, 1941)
- Uvarus satyrus (Guignot, 1939)
- Uvarus sechellensis (Régimbart, 1897)
- Uvarus spretus (Sharp, 1882)
- Uvarus straeleni Biström, 1988
- Uvarus subornatus (Sharp, 1882)
- Uvarus subtilis (LeConte, 1852)
- Uvarus suburbanus (Fall, 1917)
- Uvarus taitii Rocchi, 1991
- Uvarus texanus (Sharp, 1882)
- Uvarus ugandae Biström, 1988
- Uvarus vagefasciatus Bilardo & Rocchi, 1999
- Uvarus venustulus (Gschwendtner, 1933)
