= Paroster caecus =

Scientific classification
- Kingdom: Animalia
- Phylum: Arthropoda
- Class: Insecta
- Order: Coleoptera
- Suborder: Adephaga
- Family: Dytiscidae
- Genus: Paroster
- Species: P. caecus

Binomial name
- Paroster caecus (Watts, 1982)
- Occurrence data: ( FMNHINS 0003 568 155 Cape Tribulation, QLD)

Synonyms
- Terradessus caecus Watts,1982

Species of beetle

Paroster caecus is blind beetle in the Hydroporini tribe of the subfamily Hydroporinae in the Dytiscidae family. It was first described by Chris Watts in 1982 as Terradessus caecus. It was transferred to the genus, Paroster, in 2016 by Toussaint, Hendrich and others.

It is known only from the type locality, Mount Sorrow, Cape Tribulation in Queensland, where it has been found in rainforest.
