= Copelatus befasicus =

Scientific classification
- Kingdom: Animalia
- Phylum: Arthropoda
- Class: Insecta
- Order: Coleoptera
- Suborder: Adephaga
- Family: Dytiscidae
- Genus: Copelatus
- Species: C. befasicus

Binomial name
- Copelatus befasicus Guignot, 1956

Species of beetle

Copelatus befasicus is a species of diving beetle. It is part of the genus Copelatus of the subfamily Copelatinae in the family Dytiscidae. It was described by Félix Guignot in 1956.
