= Limbodessus leysi =

Scientific classification
- Kingdom: Animalia
- Phylum: Arthropoda
- Class: Insecta
- Order: Coleoptera
- Suborder: Adephaga
- Family: Dytiscidae
- Genus: Limbodessus
- Species: L. leysi

Binomial name
- Limbodessus leysi Watts & Humphreys, 2006
- Type sites: Mt Meld Station, Mount Morgan'"`UNIQ--ref-00000004-QINU`"'

Species of beetle

Limbodessus leysi is a carnivorous subterranean water beetle, in the Bidessini tribe of the Dytiscidae family. It was first described in 2006 by Watts and Humphreys, and the species epithet honours the entomologist, Remko Leys.

The species is endemic to Western Australia, and found in the "easterly-draining palaeodrainage systems in the Yilgarn region of Western Australia".
