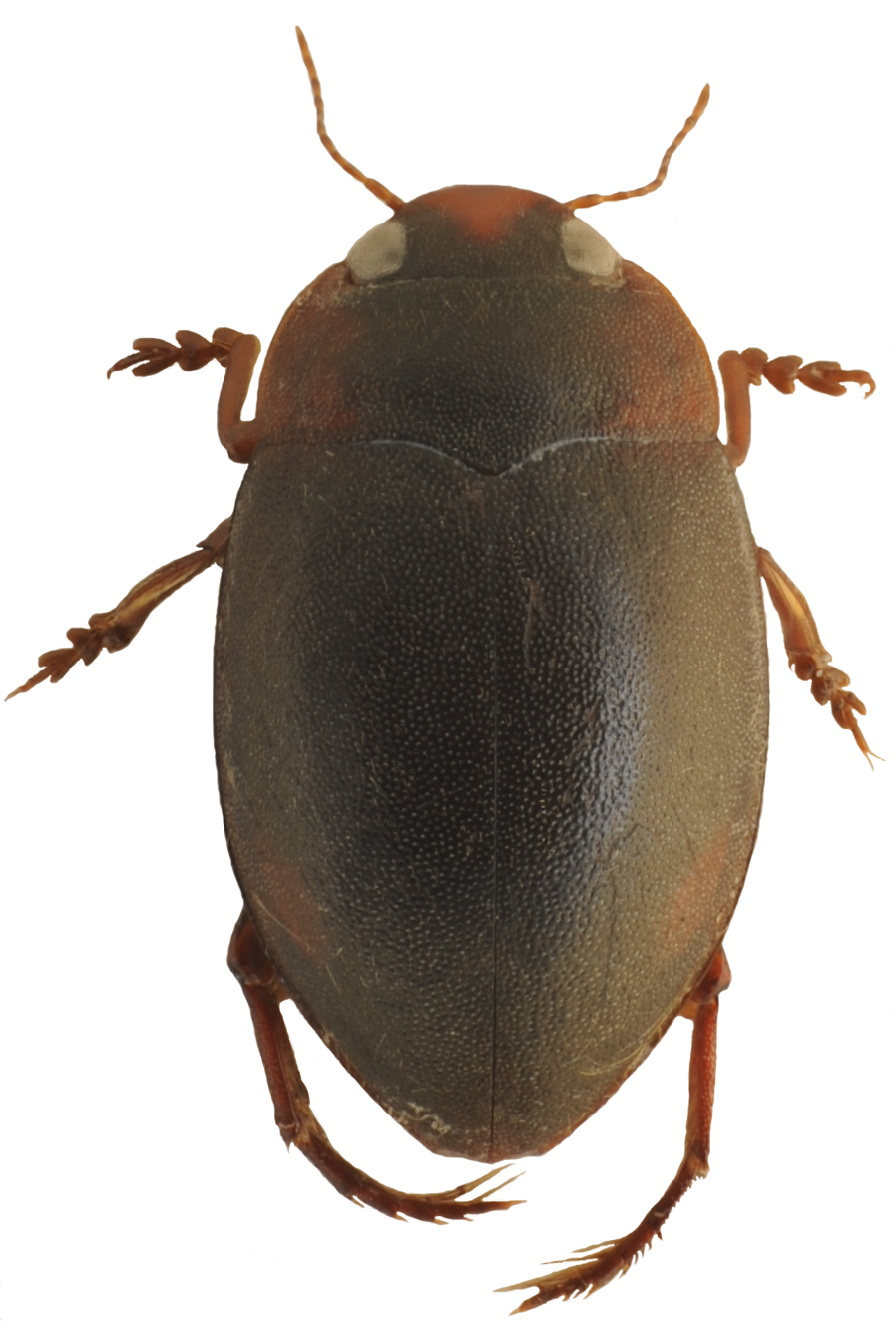

Scientific classification
- Domain: Eukaryota
- Kingdom: Animalia
- Phylum: Arthropoda
- Class: Insecta
- Order: Coleoptera
- Suborder: Adephaga
- Family: Dytiscidae
- Genus: Antiporus
- Species: A. wilsoni

Binomial name
- Antiporus wilsoni Watts, 1978

= Antiporus wilsoni =

Species of beetle

Antiporus wilsoni is a beetle in the family, Antiporus, which was first described in 1978 by Chris H.S. Watts.

It is found only in Australia, in the coastal regions of New South Wales, and Queensland, with the type specimen having been found in Caboolture.
