= Copelatus malaisei =

Scientific classification
- Kingdom: Animalia
- Phylum: Arthropoda
- Class: Insecta
- Order: Coleoptera
- Suborder: Adephaga
- Family: Dytiscidae
- Genus: Copelatus
- Species: C. malaisei

Binomial name
- Copelatus malaisei Guignot, 1954

Species of beetle

Copelatus malaisei is a species of diving beetle. It is part of the genus Copelatus, which is in the subfamily Copelatinae of the family Dytiscidae. It was described by Félix Guignot in 1954.
