= Limbodessus =

Scientific classification
- Kingdom: Animalia
- Phylum: Arthropoda
- Clade: Pancrustacea
- Class: Insecta
- Order: Coleoptera
- Suborder: Adephaga
- Family: Dytiscidae
- Subfamily: Hydroporinae
- Tribe: Bidessini
- Genus: Limbodessus; Guignot, 1939

Genus of beetles

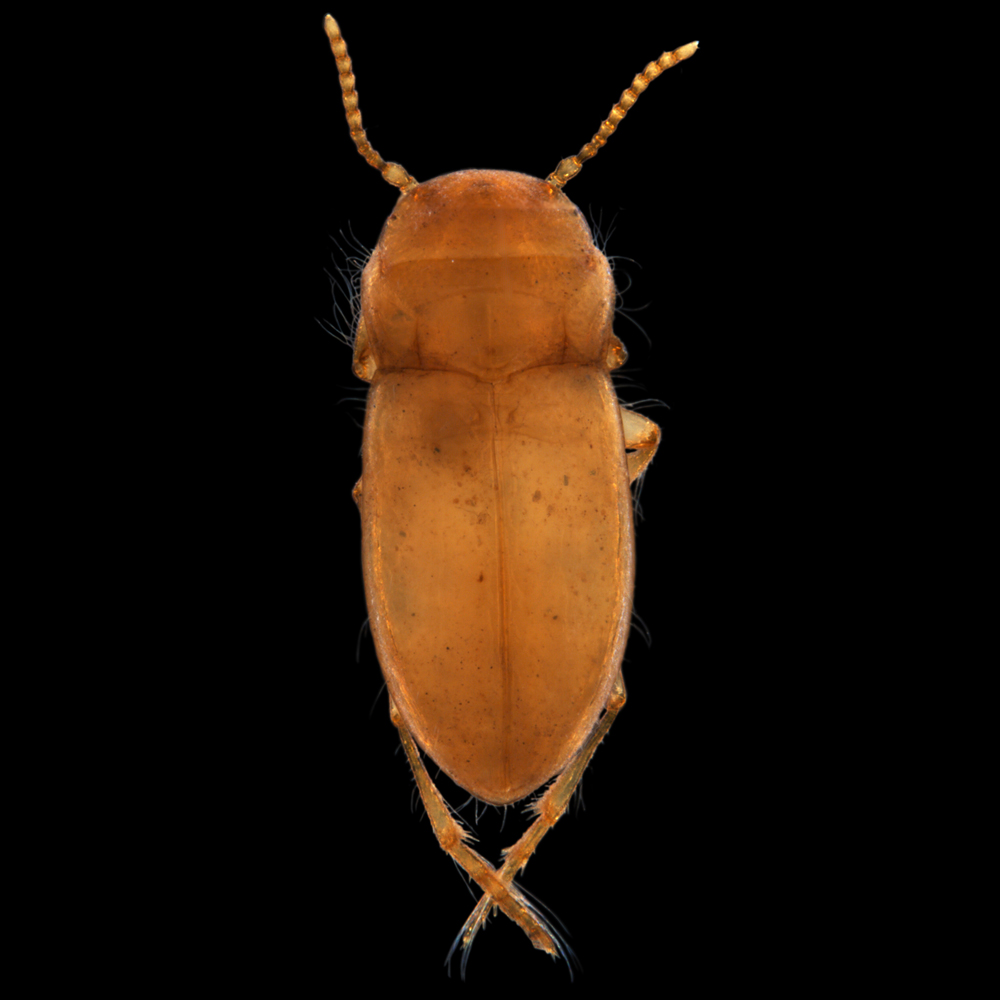
The Limbodessus bennetti

Limbodessus is a genus of beetles in the family Dytiscidae, first described by Félix Guignot in 1939. It contains the following species:

- Limbodessus amabilis (Clark, 1862)
- Limbodessus atypicalis Watts & Humphreys, 2006
- Limbodessus barwidgeeensis Watts & Humphreys, 2006
- Limbodessus bennetti Watts & McRae, 2013
- Limbodessus bialveus (Watts & Humphreys, 2003)
- Limbodessus bigbellensis (Watts & Humphreys, 2000)
- Limbodessus capeensis Watts & Leys, 2005
- Limbodessus challaensis (Watts & Humphreys, 2001)
- Limbodessus cheesmanae (J.Balfour-Browne, 1939)
- Limbodessus compactus (Clark, 1862)
- Limbodessus cooperi Watts & Humphreys, 2006
- Limbodessus cueensis (Watts & Humphreys, 2000)
- Limbodessus cunyuensis (Watts & Humphreys, 2003)
- Limbodessus curviplicatus (Zimmermann, 1927)
- Limbodessus eberhardi (Watts & Humphreys, 1999)
- Limbodessus exilis Watts & Humphreys, 2006
- Limbodessus fridaywellensis (Watts & Humphreys, 2001)
- Limbodessus gemellus (Clark, 1862)
- Limbodessus gumwellensis Watts & Humphreys, 2006
- Limbodessus hahni (Watts & Humphreys, 2000)
- Limbodessus harleyi Watts & Humphreys, 2006
- Limbodessus hillviewensis (Watts & Humphreys, 2004)
- Limbodessus hinkleri (Watts & Humphreys, 2000)
- Limbodessus inornatus (Sharp, 1882)
- Limbodessus jundeeensis (Watts & Humphreys, 2003)
- Limbodessus karalundiensis (Watts & Humphreys, 2003)
- Limbodessus lapostaae (Watts & Humphreys, 1999)
- Limbodessus leysi Watts & Humphreys, 2006
- Limbodessus macrohinkleri Watts & Humphreys, 2006
- Limbodessus macrotarsus (Watts & Humphreys, 2003)
- Limbodessus magnificus (Watts & Humphreys, 2000)
- Limbodessus masonensis (Watts & Humphreys, 2001)
- Limbodessus melitaensis Watts & Humphreys, 2006
- Limbodessus micrommatoion Watts & Humphreys, 2006
- Limbodessus microocula (Watts & Humphreys, 2004)
- Limbodessus millbilliensis Watts & Humphreys, 2006
- Limbodessus mirandaae Watts & Humphreys, 2006
- Limbodessus morgani (Watts & Humphreys, 2000)
- Limbodessus nambiensis Watts & Humphreys, 2006
- Limbodessus narryerensis Watts & Humphreys, 2006
- Limbodessus occidentalis (Watts & Humphreys, 2004)
- Limbodessus padburyensis (Watts & Humphreys, 2004)
- Limbodessus palmulaoides Watts & Humphreys, 2006
- Limbodessus phoebeae Watts & Humphreys, 2006
- Limbodessus pinnaclesensis (Watts & Humphreys, 2001)
- Limbodessus praelargus (Lea, 1899)
- Limbodessus pulpa (Watts & Humphreys, 1999)
- Limbodessus raeae Watts & Humphreys, 2006
- Limbodessus raesideensis (Watts & Humphreys, 2001)
- Limbodessus rivulus (Larson, 1994)
- Limbodessus shuckardii (Clark, 1862)
- Limbodessus silus (Watts & Humphreys, 2003)
- Limbodessus surreptitius Watts & Humphreys, 2006
- Limbodessus sweetwatersensis (Watts & Humphreys, 2003)
- Limbodessus usitatus Watts & Humphreys, 2006
- Limbodessus wilunaensis (Watts & Humphreys, 2003)
- Limbodessus windarraensis (Watts & Humphreys, 1999)
- Limbodessus wogarthaensis (Watts & Humphreys, 2004)
- Limbodessus yandalensis Watts & Humphreys, 2006
- Limbodessus yuinmeryensis (Watts & Humphreys, 2003)
