= Antiporus simplex =

Scientific classification
- Kingdom: Animalia
- Phylum: Arthropoda
- Clade: Pancrustacea
- Class: Insecta
- Order: Coleoptera
- Suborder: Adephaga
- Family: Dytiscidae
- Genus: Antiporus
- Species: A. simplex

Binomial name
- Antiporus simplex Watts, 1978

Species of beetle

Antiporus simplex is a predaceous diving beetle in the family Antiporus, first described in 1978 by Chris H.S. Watts.

It is found only in Australia (and known only from its type locality) in Bundaberg, Queensland.
