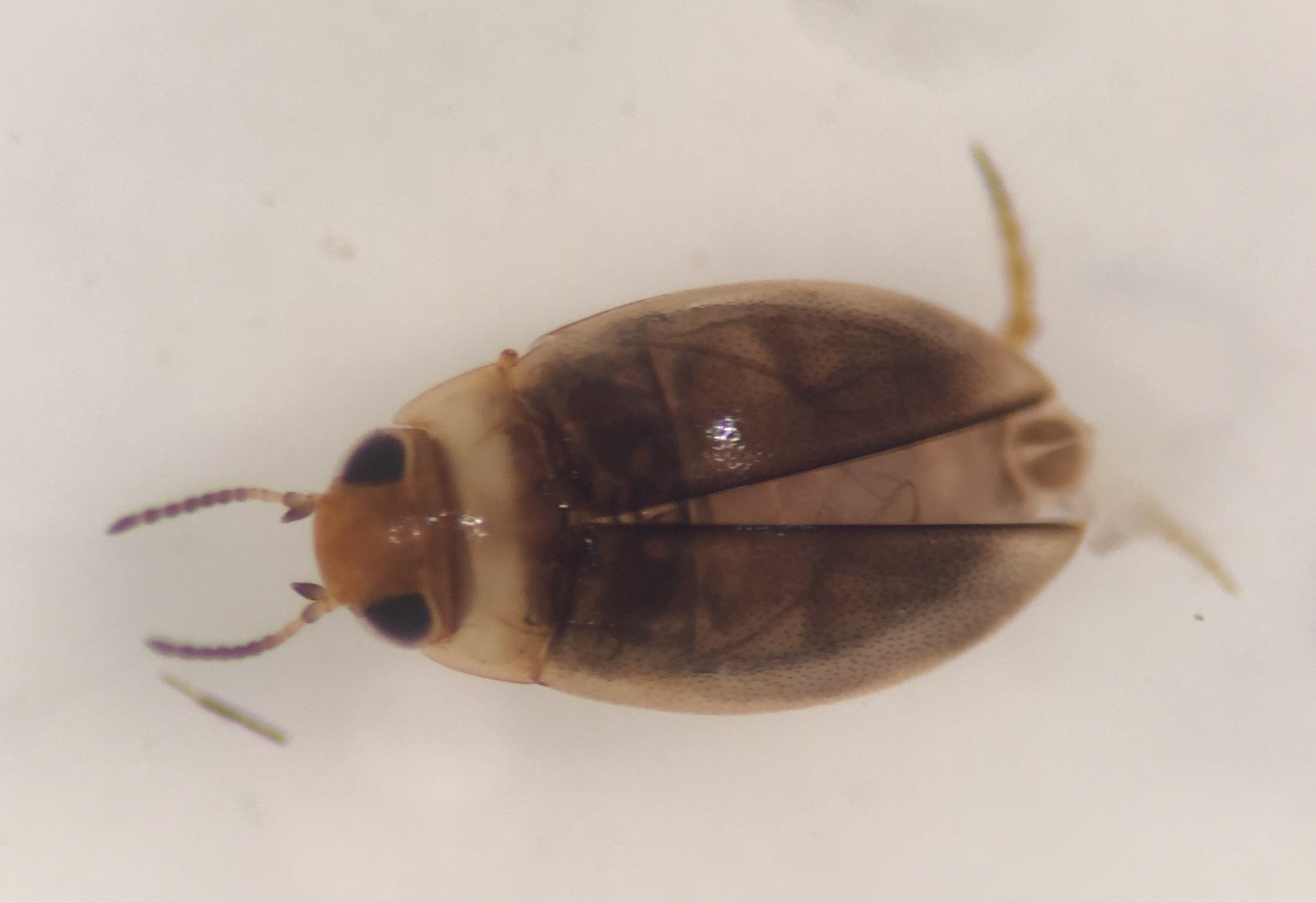

Scientific classification
- Domain: Eukaryota
- Kingdom: Animalia
- Phylum: Arthropoda
- Class: Insecta
- Order: Coleoptera
- Suborder: Adephaga
- Family: Dytiscidae
- Genus: Uvarus
- Species: U. lacustris

Binomial name
- Uvarus lacustris (Say, 1823)

= Uvarus lacustris =

Species of beetle

Uvarus lacustris is a species of predaceous diving beetle in the family Dytiscidae. It is found in North America.
