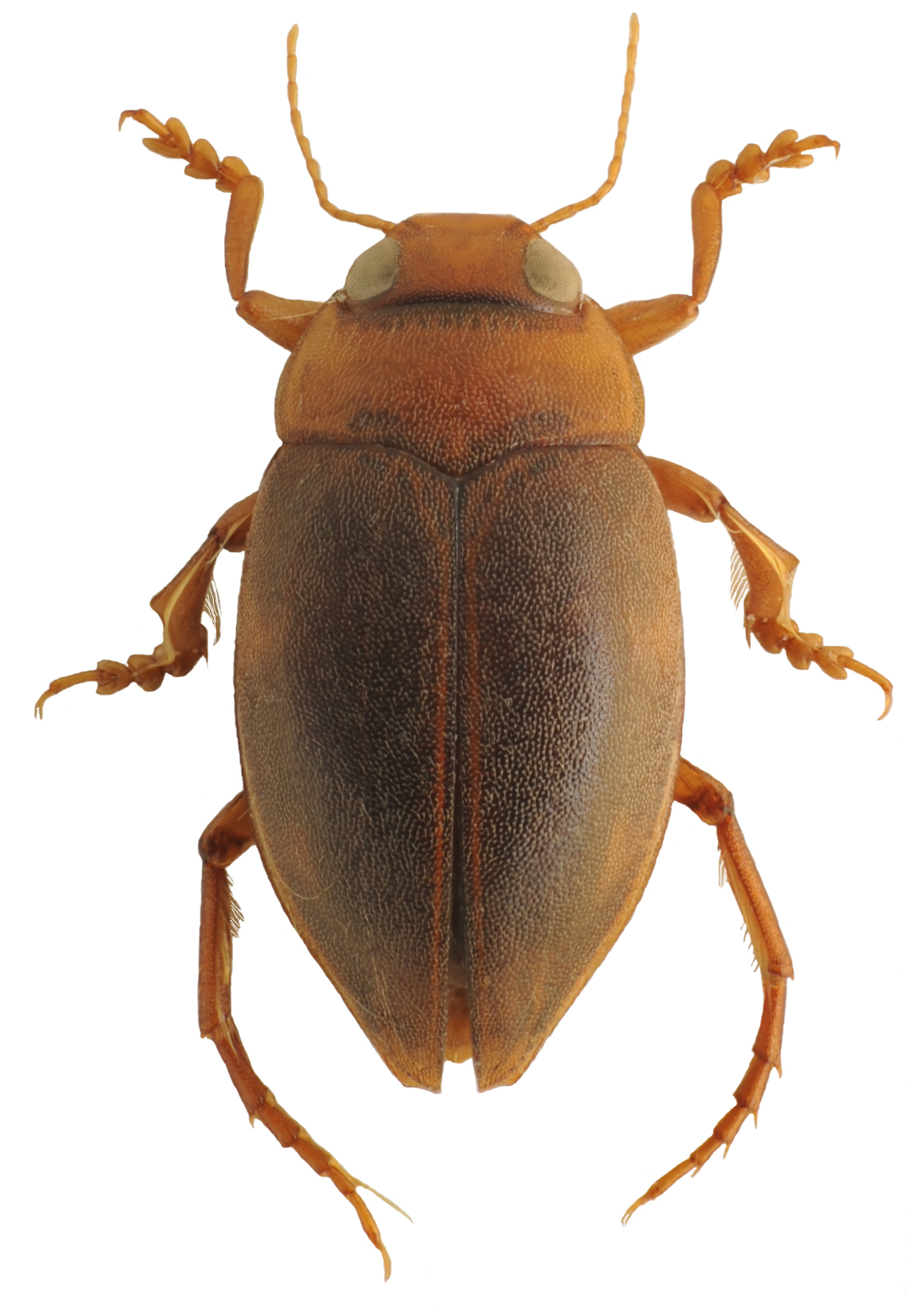

Scientific classification
- Kingdom: Animalia
- Phylum: Arthropoda
- Class: Insecta
- Order: Coleoptera
- Suborder: Adephaga
- Family: Dytiscidae
- Tribe: Hydroporini
- Genus: Antiporus; Sharp, 1882

= Antiporus =

Genus of beetles

Antiporus is a genus of beetles in the family Dytiscidae, first described in 1882 by David Sharp, which contains the following species:

- Antiporus bakewellii (Clark, 1862)
- Antiporus blakeii (Clark, 1862)
- Antiporus femoralis (Boheman, 1858)
- Antiporus gilbertii (Clark, 1862)
- Antiporus gottwaldi Hendrich, 2001
- Antiporus hollingsworthi Watts, 1997
- Antiporus interrogationis (Clark, 1862)
- Antiporus jenniferae Watts, 1997
- Antiporus mcraeae Watts & Pinder, 2000
- Antiporus pembertoni Watts, 1997
- Antiporus pennifoldae Watts & Pinder, 2000
- Antiporus simplex Watts, 1978
- Antiporus uncifer Sharp, 1882
- Antiporus willyamsi Watts, 1997
- Antiporus wilsoni Watts, 1978
