= Uvarus subtilis =

Scientific classification
- Domain: Eukaryota
- Kingdom: Animalia
- Phylum: Arthropoda
- Class: Insecta
- Order: Coleoptera
- Suborder: Adephaga
- Family: Dytiscidae
- Genus: Uvarus
- Species: U. subtilis

Binomial name
- Uvarus subtilis (LeConte, 1852)

Synonyms
- Bidessus subplicatus Hatch, 1953

Species of beetle

Uvarus subtilis is a species of predaceous diving beetle in the family Dytiscidae. It is found in North America.
