= Uvarus granarius =

Scientific classification
- Domain: Eukaryota
- Kingdom: Animalia
- Phylum: Arthropoda
- Class: Insecta
- Order: Coleoptera
- Suborder: Adephaga
- Family: Dytiscidae
- Genus: Uvarus
- Species: U. granarius

Binomial name
- Uvarus granarius (Aubé, 1838)

Species of beetle

Uvarus granarius is a species of predaceous diving beetle in the family Dytiscidae. It is found in North America.
