= Paroster arachnoides =

Scientific classification
- Domain: Eukaryota
- Kingdom: Animalia
- Phylum: Arthropoda
- Class: Insecta
- Order: Coleoptera
- Suborder: Adephaga
- Family: Dytiscidae
- Genus: Paroster
- Species: P. arachnoides

Binomial name
- Paroster arachnoides (Watts & Humphreys, 2004)

Synonyms
- Nirripirti arachnoides Watts & Humphreys, 2004

Species of beetle

Holotype site: Byro Station, Yalcallia Well, WA'"`UNIQ--ref-00000007-QINU`"'

Paroster arachnoides is water beetle in the Hydroporini tribe of the subfamily Hydroporinae in the Dytiscidae family. It was first described by Chris Watts and William Humphreys in 2004 as Nirripirti arachnoides. It was transferred to the genus, Paroster, in 2008 by Remko Leijs and Chris Watts.

It is known only from the type locality in Western Australia.
