= Leiodytes griseoguttatus =

Scientific classification
- Kingdom: Animalia
- Phylum: Arthropoda
- Class: Insecta
- Order: Coleoptera
- Suborder: Adephaga
- Family: Dytiscidae
- Genus: Leiodytes
- Species: L. griseoguttatus

Binomial name
- Leiodytes griseoguttatus (Régimbart, 1893)

Synonyms
- Bidessus griseoguttatus Régimbart, 1893; Bidessus (Clypeodytes) griseoguttatus Régimbart, 1893; Clypeodytes (Lioclypeus) griseoguttatus (Régimbart, 1893)

Species of beetle

Leiodytes griseoguttatus, is a species of predaceous diving beetle found in India and Sri Lanka.
