= Uvarus falli =

Scientific classification
- Domain: Eukaryota
- Kingdom: Animalia
- Phylum: Arthropoda
- Class: Insecta
- Order: Coleoptera
- Suborder: Adephaga
- Family: Dytiscidae
- Genus: Uvarus
- Species: U. falli

Binomial name
- Uvarus falli (Young, 1940)

Synonyms
- Bidessus falli Young, 1940

Species of beetle

Uvarus falli is a species of predaceous diving beetle in the family Dytiscidae. It is found in North America.
