= Uvarus livens =

Scientific classification
- Kingdom: Animalia
- Phylum: Arthropoda
- Class: Insecta
- Order: Coleoptera
- Suborder: Adephaga
- Family: Dytiscidae
- Subfamily: Hydroporinae
- Tribe: Bidessini
- Genus: Uvarus
- Species: U. livens

Binomial name
- Uvarus livens (Régimbart, 1892)

Synonyms
- Bidessus livens Régimbart, 1892

Species of beetle

Uvarus livens, is a species of predaceous diving beetle found in India, Andaman & Nicobar Islands, Bangladesh, Sri Lanka, and Malaysia.
