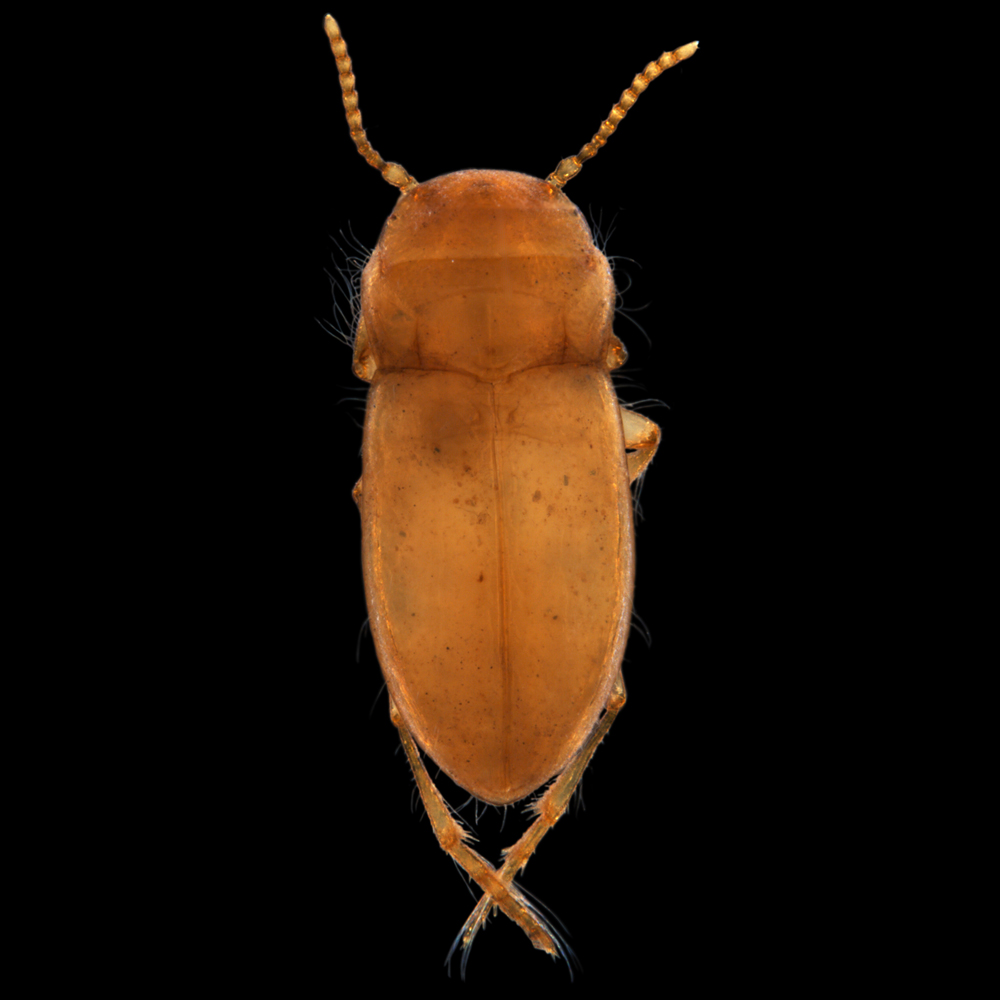

Scientific classification
- Kingdom: Animalia
- Phylum: Arthropoda
- Class: Insecta
- Order: Coleoptera
- Suborder: Adephaga
- Family: Dytiscidae
- Genus: Limbodessus
- Species: L. bennetti

Binomial name
- Limbodessus bennetti Watts & McRae, 2013

= Limbodessus bennetti =

Species of beetle

Limbodessus bennetti is a carnivorous subterranean water beetle. It is the first stygobitic Dytiscidae to be recorded in the Pilbara region of Western Australia. Of all species currently described, Limbodessus bennetti is most closely related to stygobitic members of the genus Limbodessus from the Yilgarn region of Western Australia.

== Distribution ==
This species is endemic to Western Australia. It has been recorded from a single alluvial aquifer in the northern Pilbara.

== Description ==
1.65 mm in length and relatively flat. Disc of elytra (forewings) slightly depressed, minor widening of elytra in middle, reduced hindwing.

== Etymology ==
This species is named in honour of Sean R. Bennett.
