= Paroster niger =

Scientific classification
- Domain: Eukaryota
- Kingdom: Animalia
- Phylum: Arthropoda
- Class: Insecta
- Order: Coleoptera
- Suborder: Adephaga
- Family: Dytiscidae
- Genus: Paroster
- Species: P. niger

Binomial name
- Paroster niger Watts, 1978

Species of beetle

Paroster niger is blind beetle in the Hydroporini tribe of the subfamily Hydroporinae in the Dytiscidae family. It was first described by Chris Watts in 1978.

The type locality is Rottnest Island, Western Australia, and it is found in the south-west of Western Australia.
