= Uvarus texanus =

Scientific classification
- Kingdom: Animalia
- Phylum: Arthropoda
- Class: Insecta
- Order: Coleoptera
- Suborder: Adephaga
- Family: Dytiscidae
- Genus: Uvarus
- Species: U. texanus

Binomial name
- Uvarus texanus (Sharp, 1882)

Synonyms
- Bidessus texanus Sharp, 1882

Species of beetle

Uvarus texanus is a species of predaceous diving beetle in the family Dytiscidae. It is found in North America.
