= Chris H. S. Watts =

Australian entomologist

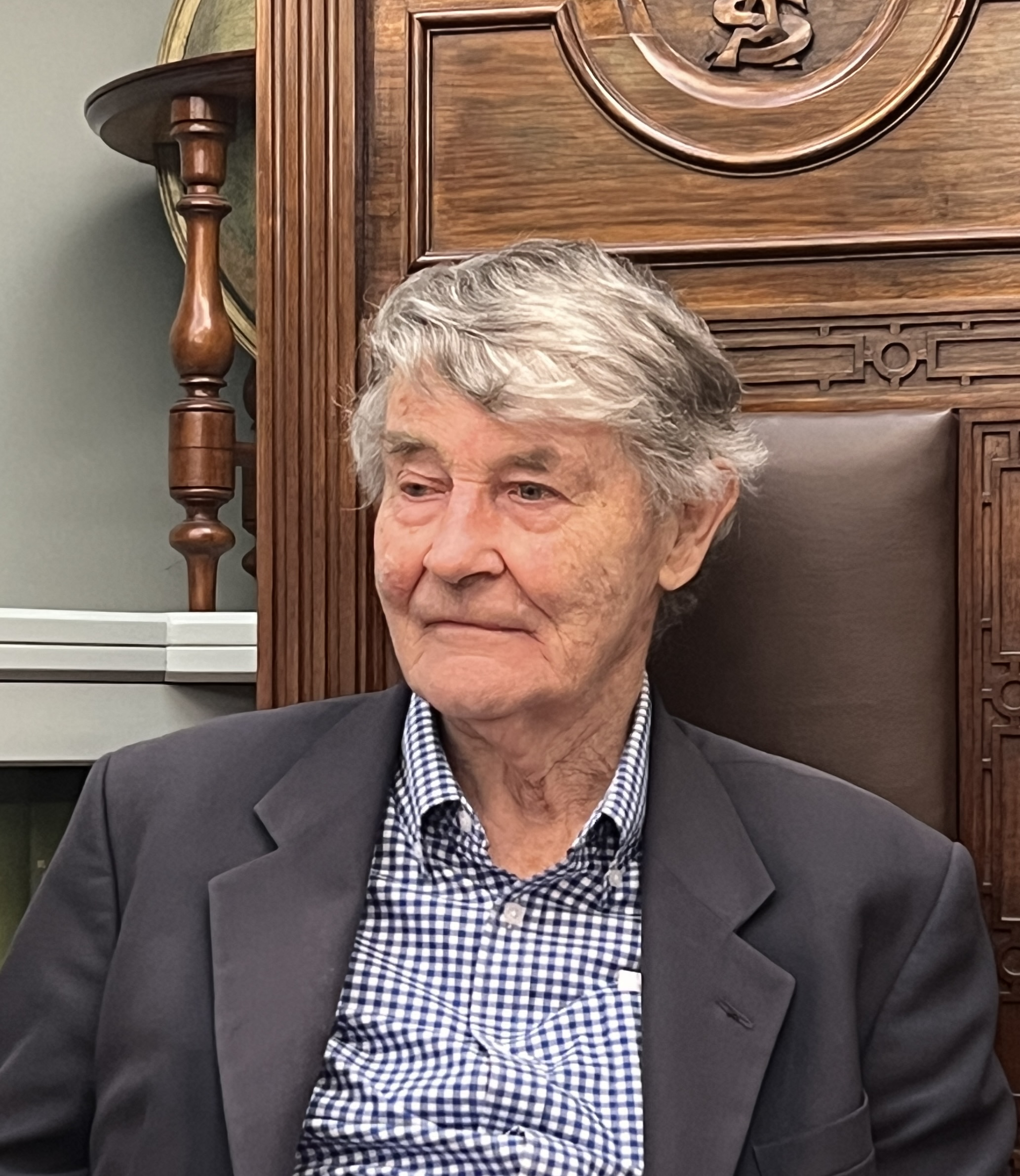
Receiving the Verco Medal from the Royal Society of South Australia, 2025

Chris H. S. Watts is an Australian entomologist, who works at the South Australian Museum and specialises particularly in water beetles. He has named over 280 taxa.

== See also ==
- Taxa named by Chris H. S. Watts
