= Félix Guignot =

French entomologist (1882-1959)

- Born: 16 November 1882; Avignon, France
- Died: 22 June 1959 (aged 76); Avignon, France
- Education: University of Montpellier
- Occupations: Physician, Entomologist

Félix Guignot was a French physician and entomologist, born on 16 November 1882 in Avignon, France.

After studying medicine at the University of Montpellier he established a private practice in his hometown of Avignon. He practiced family medicine and Obstetrics. The region around Avignon provided many excellent opportunities to collect water beetles, including large rivers and the Camargue wetlands. His first entomological article, the description of Siettitia avenionensis, was published in 1925 in the Bulletin of the Entomological Society of France. Guignot found the specimen for this description in a basin of water pumped from a farm well, which he had requested while delivering a baby at the farm.

Through his publications of 188 articles Guignot became a recognized expert on hydradephagan water beetles. His classic work, The Hydrocanthares of France, won the 1932 Dollfus prize of the Entomological Society of France. His contributions to science include the description of 514 new species, as well as his entomological collection, which is now housed in the French National Museum of Natural History.

Guignot was a founding member of the Société d’étude des Sciences naturelles de Vaucluse. He served as president of this society for nearly 31 years between 1929 and 1950.

== See also ==
- Category:Taxa named by Félix Guignot
