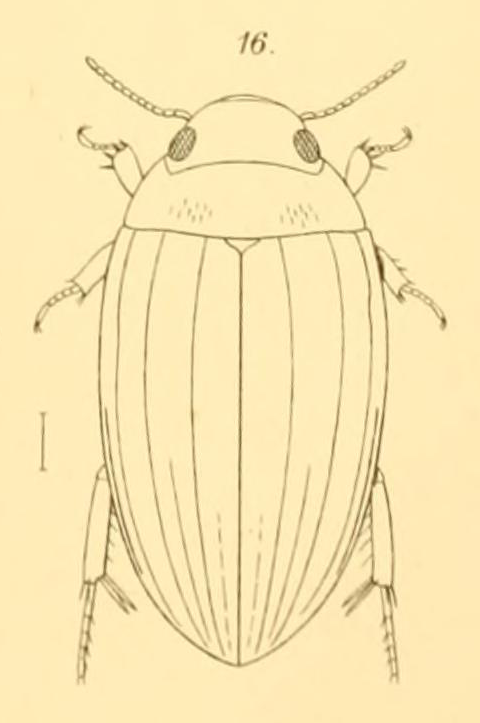
- Copelatus pandanorum ♀

Scientific classification
- Domain: Eukaryota
- Kingdom: Animalia
- Phylum: Arthropoda
- Class: Insecta
- Order: Coleoptera
- Suborder: Adephaga
- Family: Dytiscidae
- Genus: Copelatus
- Species: C. pandanorum

Binomial name
- Copelatus pandanorum Scott, 1912

= Copelatus pandanorum =

Species of beetle

Copelatus pandanorum is a species of diving beetle. It is part of the genus Copelatus in the subfamily Copelatinae of the family Dytiscidae. It was described by Hugh Scott in 1912.

Scott collected specimens from the Seychelles islands of Praslin, Silhouette, and Mahé.
