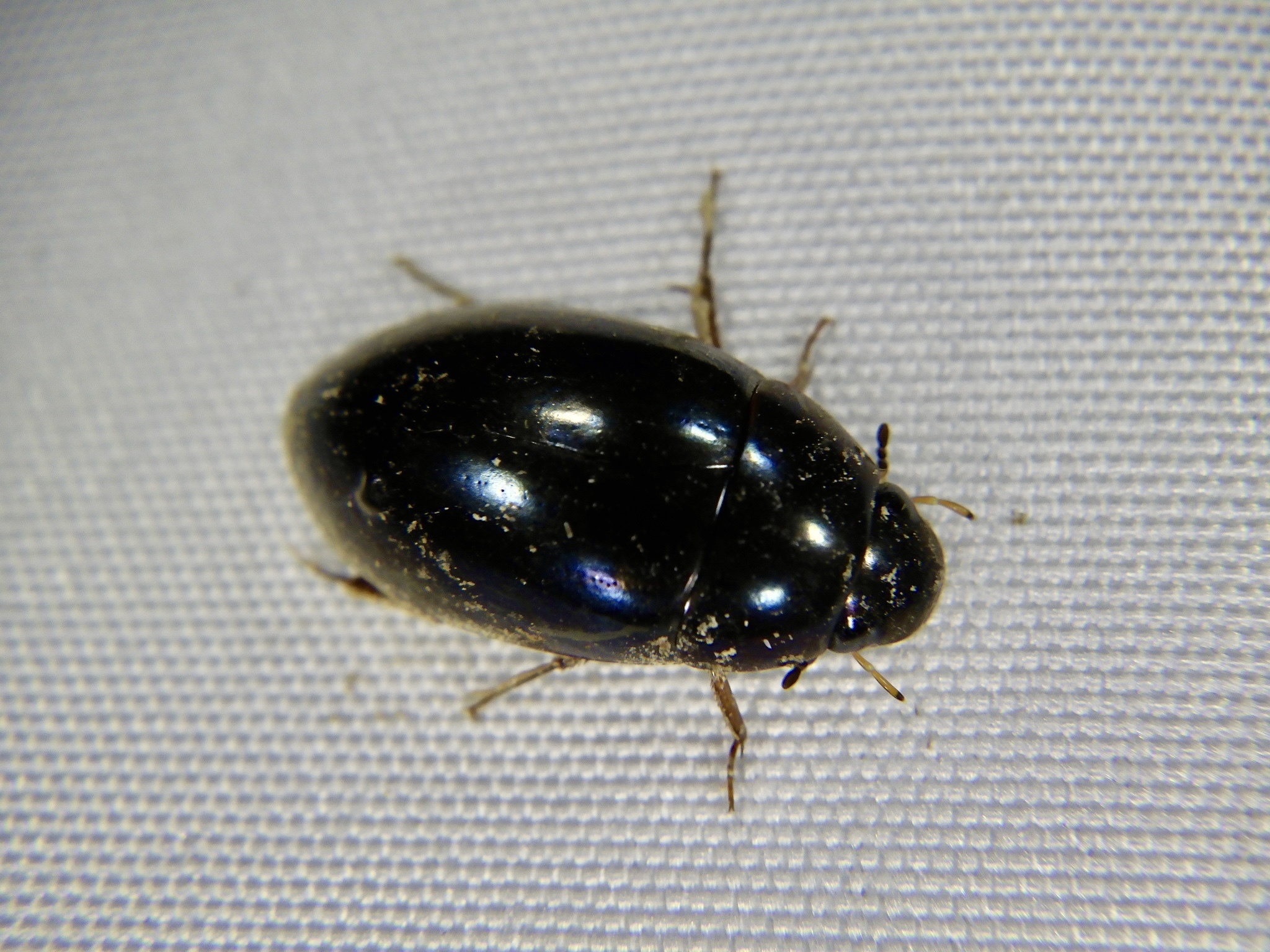
- Sternolophus rufipes, China

Scientific classification
- Kingdom: Animalia
- Phylum: Arthropoda
- Clade: Pancrustacea
- Class: Insecta
- Order: Coleoptera
- Suborder: Polyphaga
- Infraorder: Staphyliniformia
- Family: Hydrophilidae
- Subfamily: Hydrophilinae
- Tribe: Hydrophilini
- Genus: Sternolophus
- Species: S. rufipes

Binomial name
- Sternolophus rufipes (Fabricius, 1792)

Synonyms
- Hydrophilus rufipes Fabricius, 1792; Sternolophus fulvipes Motschulsky, 1854; Tropisternus mergus Kollar & L.Redtenbacher, 1844

= Sternolophus rufipes =

Species of beetle

Sternolophus rufipes is a species of water scavenger beetle found in India, Sri Lanka, China, South Korea and the Philippines.

== Description ==
This large oval species has a body size of about 10.2 mm. Elytra with four distinct rows of systematic punctures. Antennae with nine segments. Prosternum highly tectiform and carinate medially. Metasternal keel glabrous and produced into a short spine posteriorly and passed to the first ventrite. On the base of middle and hind femora, there is a hydrofuge pubescence as well as in abdominal ventrites. Mesosternal keel has a small notch and long apical setae. Posterior margin of fifth ventrite is rounded.
