= Mimamblymora =

Scientific classification
- Kingdom: Animalia
- Phylum: Arthropoda
- Class: Insecta
- Order: Coleoptera
- Suborder: Polyphaga
- Infraorder: Cucujiformia
- Family: Cerambycidae
- Genus: Niphoparmena
- Subgenus: Mimamblymora; Breuning, 1950

Species
- Niphoparmena flavescens Breuning, 1950

Synonyms
- Mimalblymoroides Breuning, 1976

Species of beetle

Mimamblymora is a subgenus of longhorn beetle in the family Cerambycidae. It was described by Stephan von Breuning in 1950, originally under the genus Niphoparmena.
