= Copelatus gardineri =

Scientific classification
- Domain: Eukaryota
- Kingdom: Animalia
- Phylum: Arthropoda
- Class: Insecta
- Order: Coleoptera
- Suborder: Adephaga
- Family: Dytiscidae
- Genus: Copelatus
- Species: C. gardineri

Binomial name
- Copelatus gardineri Scott, 1912

Species of beetle

Copelatus gardineri is a species of diving beetle. It is part of the genus Copelatus in the subfamily Copelatinae of the family Dytiscidae. It was described by Hugh Scott in 1912.

Scott collected specimens from the Seychelles islands of Praslin, Silhouette, and Mahé.
