= Brownephilus =

Scientific classification
- Kingdom: Animalia
- Phylum: Arthropoda
- Clade: Pancrustacea
- Class: Insecta
- Order: Coleoptera
- Suborder: Polyphaga
- Infraorder: Staphyliniformia
- Family: Hydrophilidae
- Tribe: Hydrophilini
- Genus: Brownephilus; Mouchamps, 1959

Genus of beetles

Brownephilus is a genus of water scavenger beetles in the family Hydrophilidae containing two described species. Brownephilus was formerly a subgenus of Hydrobiomorpha and was elevated to genus by Andrew E.Z. Short in 2010.

== Species ==
These two species belong to the genus Brownephilus:

- Brownephilus levantinus (Balfour-Browne, 1939)
- Brownephilus major (İncerkara, Mart, Polat & Karaca, 2009)
