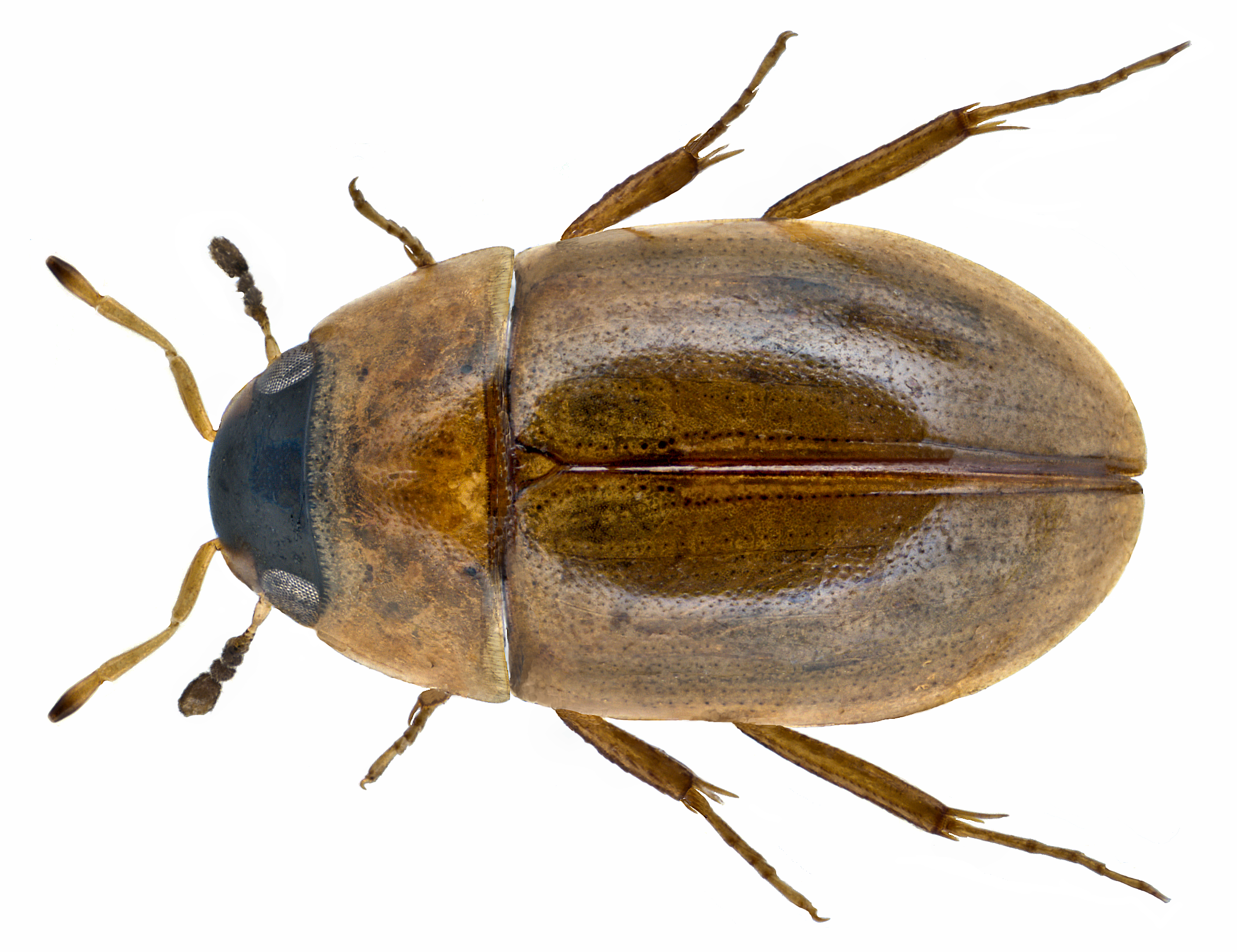

Scientific classification
- Kingdom: Animalia
- Phylum: Arthropoda
- Class: Insecta
- Order: Coleoptera
- Suborder: Polyphaga
- Infraorder: Staphyliniformia
- Family: Hydrophilidae
- Subfamily: Hydrophilinae
- Tribe: Hydrophilini
- Genus: Enochrus
- Species: E. esuriens

Binomial name
- Enochrus esuriens (Walker, 1858)

Synonyms
- Philhydrus esuriens Walker, 1858; Enochrus esuriens Kniž, 1924; Pylophilus nigriceps Motschulsky, 1860; Philhydrus nigriceps Redtenbacher, 1868; Philhydrus pullus Fauvel, 1883; Philhydrus ornaticeps Sharp, 1884; Philydrus pullus Fauvel, 1883; Philydrus ornaticeps Sharp, 1884

= Enochrus esuriens =

Species of beetle

Enochrus (Methydrus) esuriens, is a species of water scavenger beetle found in Indochina, Korea, China, Japan, Bhutan, Iran, Iraq, Nepal, India, Pakistan, Philippines, Sri Lanka, Vietnam, Sunda Island, Saudi Arabia and Australia.

== Description ==
Body length is about 2.4 to 2.8 mm. Body oval and convex. Dorsum yellowish brown whereas ventrum blackish. Head dark with preocular spots. Mentum consists with compact long setae on anterior part. Pronotum without a central dark spot. Elytra without stria. Mesoventral process is protruded posteriorly, with characteristic beak-shaped with sparse setae. Abdomen consists with five vetrites and zig-zag shaped maxillary palpi. Sternite VII with emargination visible in between apex and medial part. Median lobe of aedeagus in male is long and triangular along with reversed U-shaped and relatively thick corona.

It is inhabited in both brackish and fresh water.
