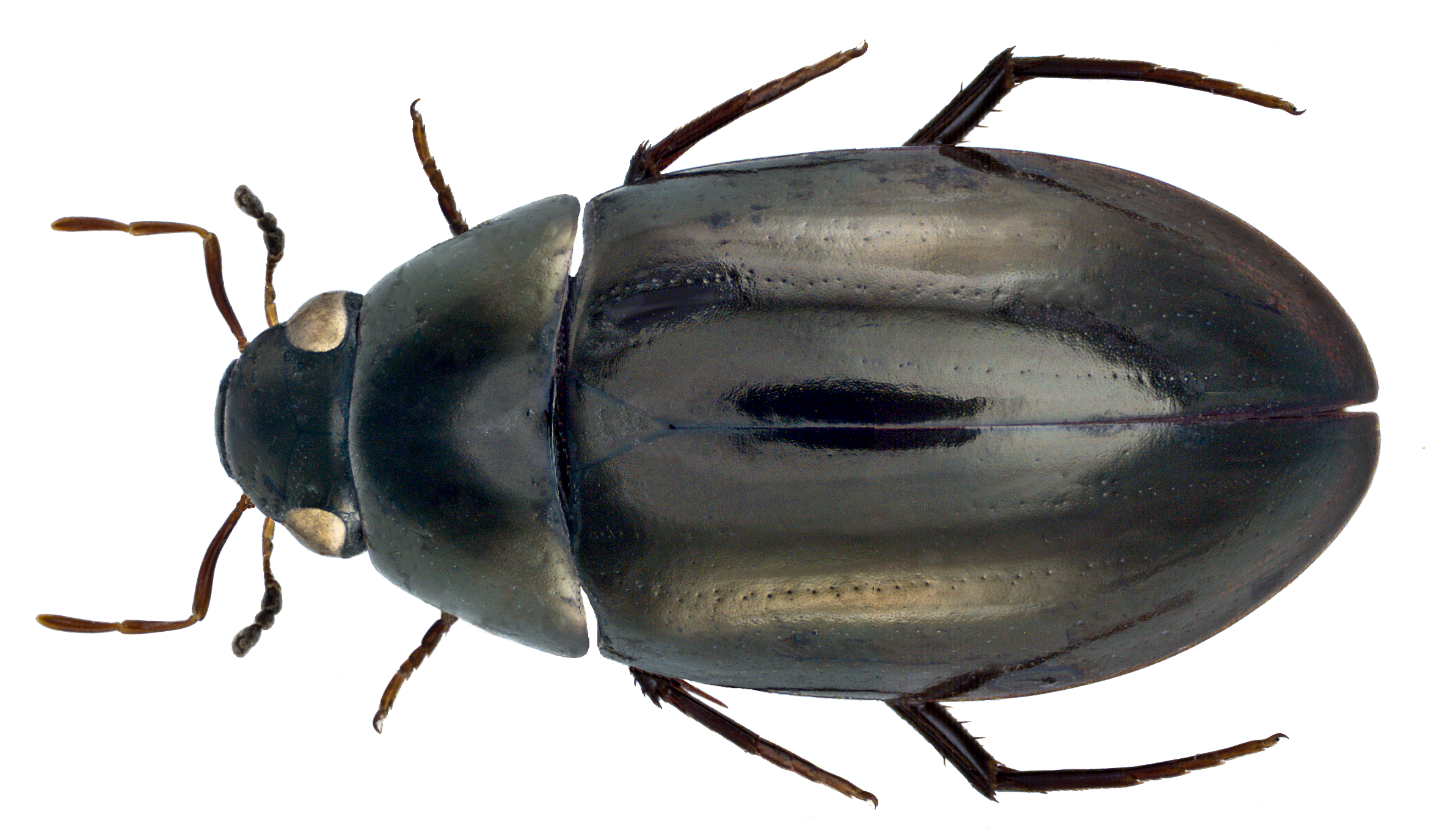

Scientific classification
- Kingdom: Animalia
- Phylum: Arthropoda
- Class: Insecta
- Order: Coleoptera
- Suborder: Polyphaga
- Infraorder: Staphyliniformia
- Family: Hydrophilidae
- Subfamily: Hydrophilinae
- Tribe: Hydrophilini
- Genus: Sternolophus
- Species: S. inconspicuus

Binomial name
- Sternolophus inconspicuus (Nietner, 1856)

Synonyms
- Hydrous inconspicuus Nietner, 1856; Sternolophus brachyacanthus Régimbart, 1902

= Sternolophus inconspicuus =

Species of beetle

Sternolophus inconspicuus, is a species of water scavenger beetle. It ranges from India and Sri Lanka to Southeast Asia, north to Korea and Japan.

== Description ==
This large oval species has a body size of about 10.2 mm. Elytra with four distinct rows of systematic punctures. Antennae with nine segments. Prosternum highly tectiform and medially carinate. On the base of middle and hind femora, there is a hydrofuge pubescence as well as in abdominal ventrites. Metasternal keel glabrous and produced into a short spine posteriorly. Mesosternal keel has a small notch. There is an apical emargination on the posterior margin of fifth ventrite.
