= Enochrus diffusus =

Scientific classification
- Domain: Eukaryota
- Kingdom: Animalia
- Phylum: Arthropoda
- Class: Insecta
- Order: Coleoptera
- Suborder: Polyphaga
- Infraorder: Staphyliniformia
- Family: Hydrophilidae
- Genus: Enochrus
- Species: E. diffusus

Binomial name
- Enochrus diffusus (LeConte, 1855)

Species of beetle

Enochrus diffusus is a species of water scavenger beetle in the family Hydrophilidae. It is found in North America.
