= Protistolophus =

Scientific classification
- Kingdom: Animalia
- Phylum: Arthropoda
- Clade: Pancrustacea
- Class: Insecta
- Order: Coleoptera
- Suborder: Polyphaga
- Infraorder: Staphyliniformia
- Family: Hydrophilidae
- Subfamily: Hydrophilinae
- Tribe: Hydrophilini
- Genus: Protistolophus; Short, 2010
- Species: P. spangleri

Binomial name
- Protistolophus spangleri Short, 2010

Species of beetle

Protistolophus spangleri is a species of water scavenger beetles in the family Hydrophilidae and the only species in the genus Protistolophus. Protistolophus spangleri was described as a new species and genus by Andrew E.Z. Short in 2010. The species is known from Venezuela and northern Brazil.
