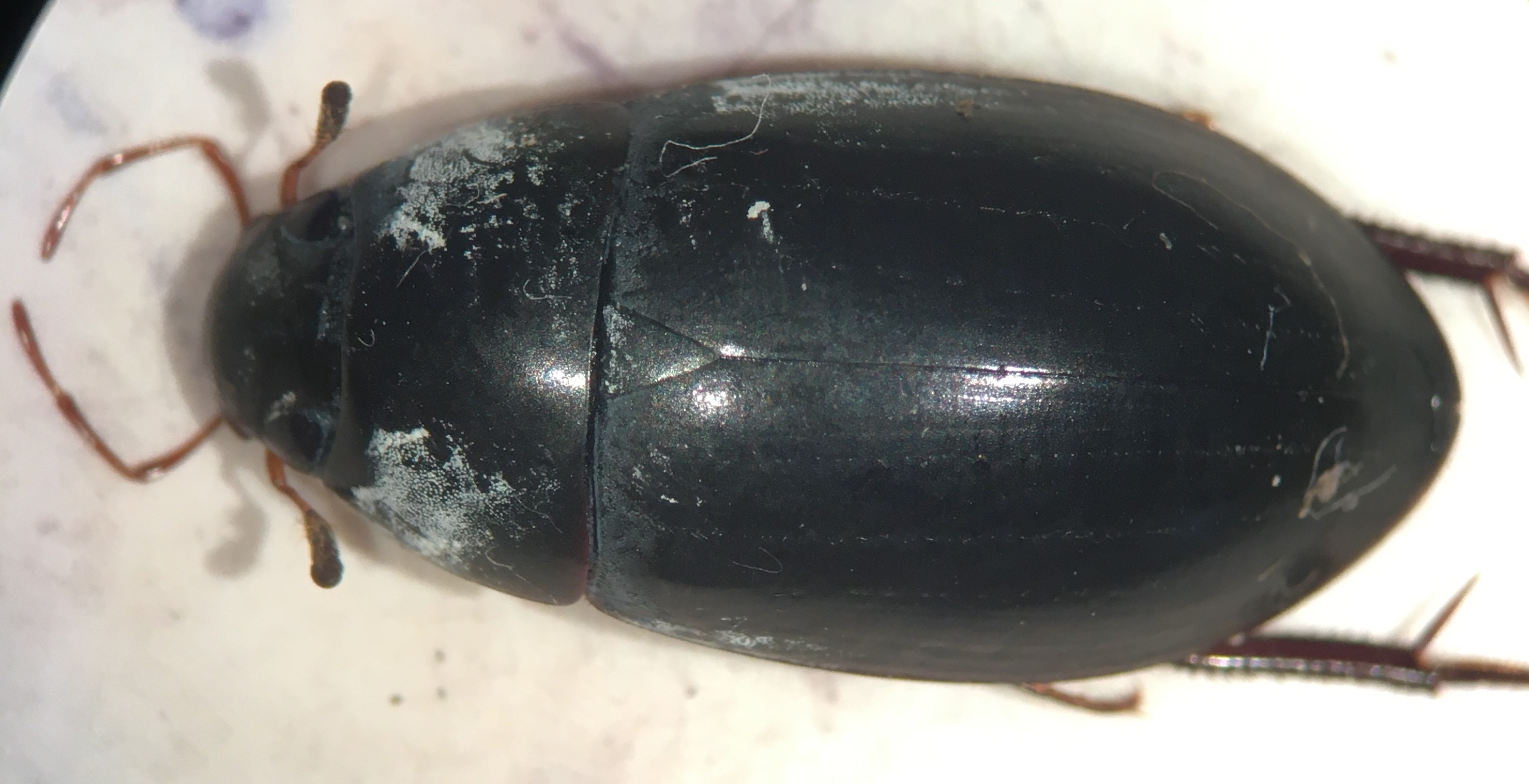

Scientific classification
- Domain: Eukaryota
- Kingdom: Animalia
- Phylum: Arthropoda
- Class: Insecta
- Order: Coleoptera
- Suborder: Polyphaga
- Infraorder: Staphyliniformia
- Family: Hydrophilidae
- Genus: Hydrobiomorpha
- Species: H. casta

Binomial name
- Hydrobiomorpha casta (Say, 1835)

= Hydrobiomorpha casta =

Species of beetle

Hydrobiomorpha casta is a species of water scavenger beetle in the family Hydrophilidae. It is found in the Caribbean, Central America, and North America.
