= Niphoparmena obliquefasciata =

Scientific classification
- Kingdom: Animalia
- Phylum: Arthropoda
- Class: Insecta
- Order: Coleoptera
- Suborder: Polyphaga
- Infraorder: Cucujiformia
- Family: Cerambycidae
- Genus: Niphoparmena
- Species: N. obliquefasciata

Binomial name
- Niphoparmena obliquefasciata (Breuning, 1939)

Synonyms
- Mecynome (Niphoparmena) obliquefasciata Breuning, 1939

Species of beetle

Niphoparmena obliquefasciata is a species of beetle in the family Cerambycidae. It was described by Stephan von Breuning in 1939.

The beetle is 6.5 millimetres (0.26 in) long and 1.75 millimetres (0.069 in) wide, and its type locality is the West Aberdare Range, Kenya.
