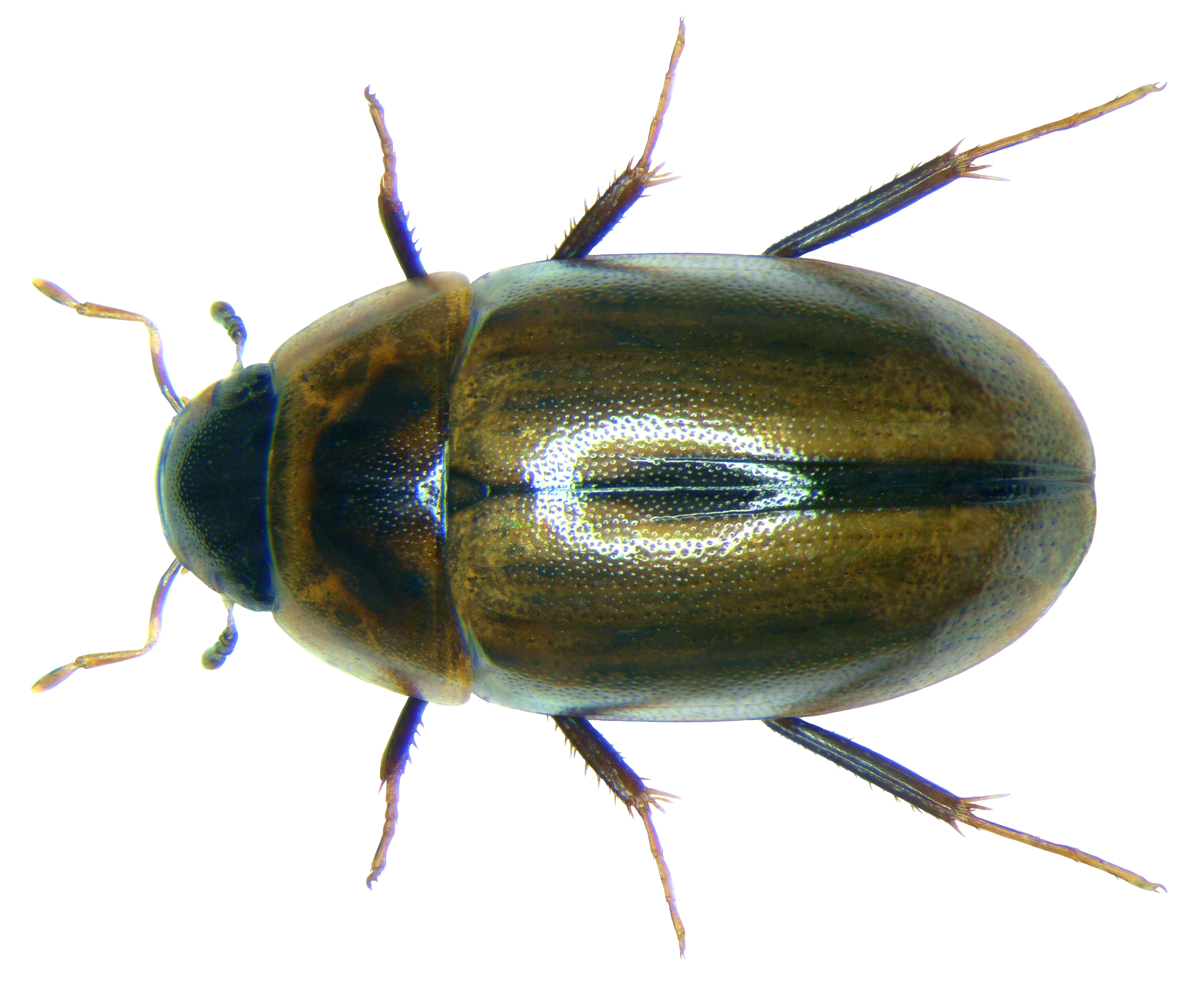
- Enochrus coarctatus

Scientific classification
- Kingdom: Animalia
- Phylum: Arthropoda
- Class: Insecta
- Order: Coleoptera
- Suborder: Polyphaga
- Infraorder: Staphyliniformia
- Family: Hydrophilidae
- Tribe: Hydrophilini
- Genus: Enochrus; Thomson, 1859

Synonyms
- Philhydrus Brullé, 1891

= Enochrus =

Genus of beetles

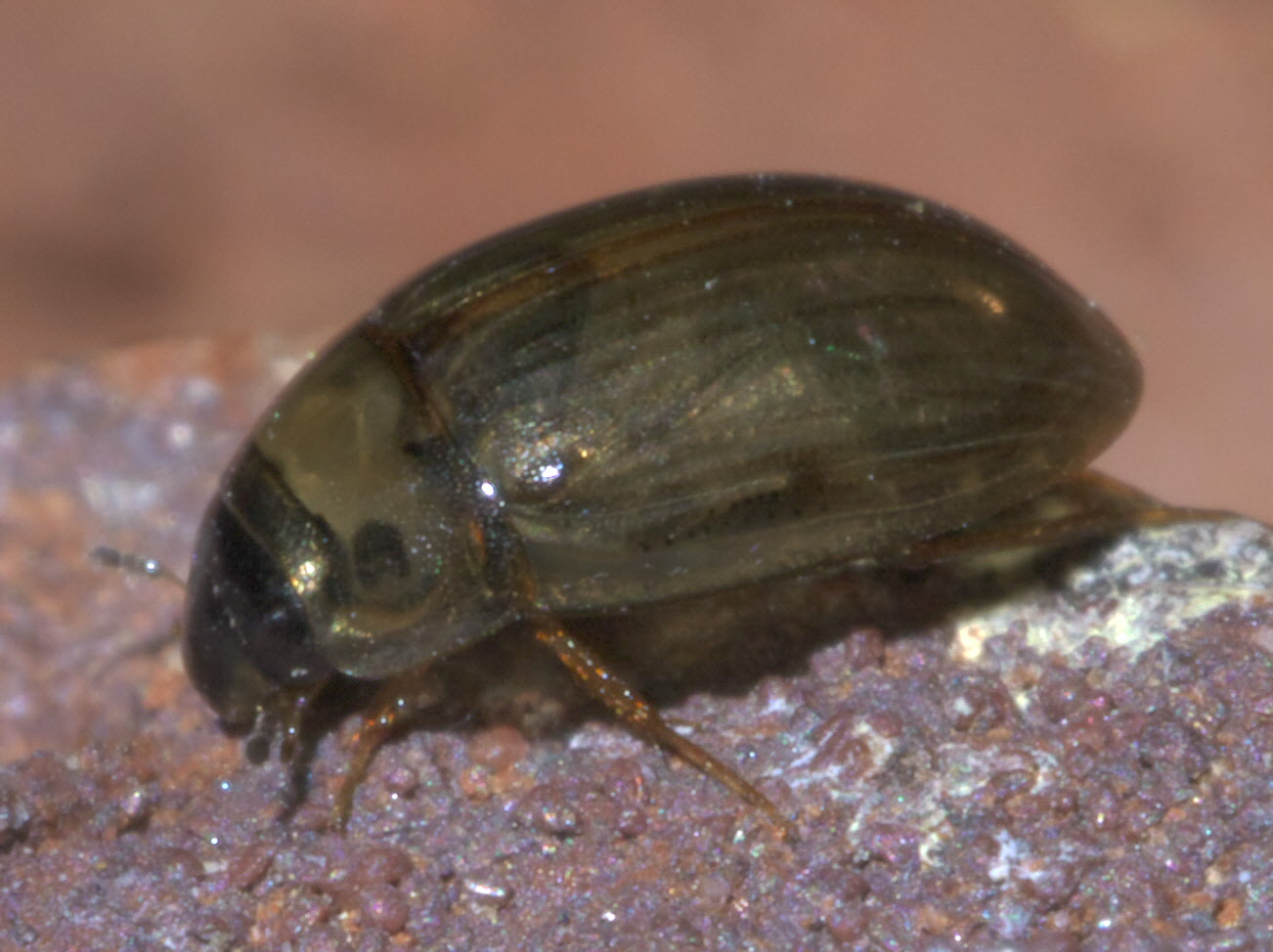

Enochrus, a genus of water scavenger beetles, is the third-largest genus of hydrophilids with 229 species in six subgenera worldwide.

== Subgenera ==
- Enochrus Thomson, 1859
- Hocophilydrus Kniz, 1911
- Hugoscottia Knisch, 1922
- Hydatotrephis MacLeary, 1871
- Lumetus Zaitzev, 1908
- Methydrus Rey, 1885

== Species ==
These 67 species belong to the genus Enochrus:

- Enochrus aequalis (Sharp, 1882)^{i c g}
- Enochrus affinis (Thunberg, 1794)^{g}
- Enochrus aridus Gundersen, 1977^{i c g}
- Enochrus ater (Kuwert, 1888)^{g}
- Enochrus bartletti Short, 2004^{g}
- Enochrus bicolor (Fabricius, 1792)^{g}
- Enochrus blatchleyi (Fall, 1924)^{i c g b}
- Enochrus calabricus (Ferro, 1986)^{g}
- Enochrus californicus (Horn, 1890)^{i c g b}
- Enochrus carinatus (LeConte, 1855)^{i c g}
- Enochrus cinctus (Say, 1824)^{i c g b}
- Enochrus coarctatus (Gredler, 1863)^{g}
- Enochrus concii Chiesa, 1965^{g}
- Enochrus consors (Leconte, 1863)^{i c g b}
- Enochrus consortus Green, 1946^{i c g b}
- Enochrus cristatus (LeConte, 1855)^{i c g}
- Enochrus cuspidatus (LeConte, 1878)^{i c g}
- Enochrus darwini (Knisch, 1922)^{i c g}
- Enochrus debilis (Sharp, 1882)^{i c}
- Enochrus diffusus (LeConte, 1855)^{i c g b}
- Enochrus elongatulus (MacLeay, 1871)^{g}
- Enochrus esuriens (Walker, 1858)^{g}
- Enochrus falcarius Hebauer, 1991^{g}
- Enochrus fimbriatus (Melsheimer, 1844)^{i c g}
- Enochrus flavicans^{g}
- Enochrus fragiloides d'Orchymont, 1925^{g}
- Enochrus fuscipennis (Thomson, 1884)^{g}
- Enochrus grossi Short, 2003^{i c g}
- Enochrus halophilus (Bedel, 1878)^{g}
- Enochrus hamifer (Ganglbauer, 1901)^{g}
- Enochrus hamiltoni (Horn, 1890)^{i c g b}
- Enochrus hispanicus (Kuwert, 1888)^{g}
- Enochrus interruptus Gundersen, 1977^{i c g}
- Enochrus maculiceps (MacLeay, 1871)^{g}
- Enochrus malabarensis (Régimbart, 1903)^{g}
- Enochrus mauritiensis (Régimbart, 1903)^{g}
- Enochrus melanocephalus (Olivier, 1792)^{i c g}
- Enochrus mexicanus (Sharp, 1882)^{i c}
- Enochrus morenae (Heyden, 1870)^{g}
- Enochrus natalensis (Gemminger & Harold, 1868)^{g}
- Enochrus negrus Gundersen, 1977^{i c g}
- Enochrus nigritus (Sharp, 1872)^{g}
- Enochrus obscurus (Sharp, 1882)^{i c}
- Enochrus ochraceus (Melsheimer, 1844)^{i c g b}
- Enochrus ochropterus (Marsham, 1802)^{g}
- Enochrus parumstriatus Hebauer, 2005^{g}
- Enochrus piceus Miller, 1964^{i c g}
- Enochrus plicatus^{g}
- Enochrus politus (Küster, 1849)^{g}
- Enochrus pygmaeus (Fabricius, 1792)^{i c g b}
- Enochrus quadripunctatus (Herbst, 1797)^{g}
- Enochrus ragusae (Kuwert, 1888)^{g}
- Enochrus reflexipennis (Zimmermann, 1869)^{i c g}
- Enochrus sagrae Knisch, 1924^{i c g}
- Enochrus salomonis (J.Sahlberg, 1900)^{g}
- Enochrus sauteri Orchymont, 1913^{g}
- Enochrus sayi Gundersen, 1977^{i c g b}
- Enochrus segmentinotatus (Kuwert, 1888)^{g}
- Enochrus simulans (Sharp, 1873)^{g}
- Enochrus spangleri^{g}
- Enochrus sublongus (Fall, 1926)^{i c g}
- Enochrus subsignatus (Harold, 1877)^{g}
- Enochrus talamanca^{g}
- Enochrus testaceus (Fabricius, 1801)^{g}
- Enochrus tritus (Broun, 1880)^{g}
- Enochrus variegatus Steinheil, 1869^{g}
- Enochrus vulgaris Steinheil, 1869^{g}

Data sources: i = ITIS, c = Catalogue of Life, g = GBIF, b = Bugguide.net
