= Niphoparmena latifrons =

Scientific classification
- Kingdom: Animalia
- Phylum: Arthropoda
- Class: Insecta
- Order: Coleoptera
- Suborder: Polyphaga
- Infraorder: Cucujiformia
- Family: Cerambycidae
- Genus: Niphoparmena
- Species: N. latifrons

Binomial name
- Niphoparmena latifrons (Breuning, 1940)

Species of beetle

Niphoparmena latifrons is a species of beetle in the family Cerambycidae. It was described by Stephan von Breuning in 1940.
