= Niphoparmena lindblomi =

Scientific classification
- Domain: Eukaryota
- Kingdom: Animalia
- Phylum: Arthropoda
- Class: Insecta
- Order: Coleoptera
- Suborder: Polyphaga
- Infraorder: Cucujiformia
- Family: Cerambycidae
- Genus: Niphoparmena
- Species: N. lindblomi

Binomial name
- Niphoparmena lindblomi Aurivillius, 1925

Species of beetle

Niphoparmena lindblomi is a species of beetle in the family Cerambycidae. It was described by Per Olof Christopher Aurivillius in 1925.
