= Niphoparmena grossepunctata =

Scientific classification
- Kingdom: Animalia
- Phylum: Arthropoda
- Class: Insecta
- Order: Coleoptera
- Suborder: Polyphaga
- Infraorder: Cucujiformia
- Family: Cerambycidae
- Genus: Niphoparmena
- Species: N. grossepunctata

Binomial name
- Niphoparmena grossepunctata Breuning, 1942

Species of beetle

Niphoparmena grossepunctata is a species of beetle in the family Cerambycidae. It was described by Stephan von Breuning in 1942.
