= Harry Melville (chemist) =

British chemist, academic and academic administrator

Professor Sir Harry Melville KCB FRS FRSE

Principal of Queen Mary College
- In office 1967–1976
- Preceded by: Sir Thomas Percival Creed
- Succeeded by: Sir James Woodham Mentor

Chairman of the Science Research Council
- In office 1965–1967
- Preceded by: New post
- Succeeded by: Brian Flowers, Baron Flowers

Permanent Secretary of the Department of Scientific and Industrial Research
- In office 1956–1965

Personal details
- Born: Harry Work Melville; 28 April 1908 Edinburgh, Scotland
- Died: 14 June 2000 (aged 92)
- Spouse: Janet (m. 1942–2000)
- Children: Two
- Education: Preston Street School; George Heriot's School
- Alma mater: Heriot-Watt College; University of Edinburgh

Sir Harry Work Melville, KCB, FRS, FRSE (27 April 1908 – 14 June 2000) was a British chemist, academic, and academic administrator, who specialised in polymer research. He spent his early career in academia as a lecturer and researcher, before moving into administration as a civil servant and university college head.

He was a fellow of Trinity College, Cambridge, from 1933 to 1944, Professor of Chemistry at the University of Aberdeen from 1945 to 1947, and Mason Professor of Chemistry at the University of Birmingham from 1948 to 1956. Having moved into administration, he was permanent secretary of the Department of Scientific and Industrial Research from 1956 to 1965, chairman of the Science Research Council from 1965 to 1967, and principal of Queen Mary College from 1967 to 1976.

Melvin was elected to the fellowship of the Royal Society of Edinburgh and of the Royal Society. He was awarded Meldola Medal by the Institute of Chemistry and the Davy Medal by the Royal Society. He gave the Royal Institution Christmas Lectures in 1955 and the Royal Society's Bakerian Lecture in 1956. He was knighted as a Knight Commander of the Order of the Bath in 1958.

== Early life and education ==
Melville was born on 27 April 1908 in Edinburgh, Scotland. He was the son of Thomas Melville and his wife, Esther Cumming Burnet Nicol. They lived at 233 Dalkeith Road in the south of Edinburgh.

He was educated at Preston Street School, a state primary school in Edinburgh, and at George Heriot's School, a private school in Old Town, Edinburgh. He then studied for a year at Heriot-Watt College, a technical college that specialised in engineering.

Having won a scholarship as a Carnegie Scholar, Melville studied chemistry at the University of Edinburgh. He graduated with a first class honours degree in 1930. He was then awarded a Carnegie Research Scholarship and undertook research toward a doctorate. He competed his Doctor of Philosophy (PhD) degree in 1933 and his doctoral thesis was titled "Investigation of molecular structure and chemical change by means of band spectra". He was awarded a Doctor of Science (DSc) degree, a higher doctorate, by Edinburgh in 1935.

== Academic career ==
In 1933, Melville was elected a fellow of Trinity College, Cambridge. He also worked at the Colloid Science Laboratory in Cambridge under Eric Rideal, and in 1938 became its assistant director of research. His research during this period was focused on polymers.

In 1939, Melville was appointed a professor as Chair of Chemistry at the University of Aberdeen. However, war broke out before he could take up the post. During World War II, he worked for the British government. From 1940 to 1943, he served as Scientific Adviser to the Chief Superintendent of the Ministry of Supply, and was based at Porton Down. Then, from 1943 to 1945, he served as superintendent of the Radar Research Station at Malvern, Worcestershire.

After the war ended in 1945, Melville returned to the University of Aberdeen. He worked there for the next three years, and his research was focused on gas kinetics and polymer kinetics. In 1948, he moved to the University of Birmingham, where he had been appointed Mason Professor of Chemistry. There, he developed a team of doctoral students and postdoctoral researchers who specialised in polymer chemistry.

In 1956, Melville moved in administration upon his appointment as Permanent Secretary of the Department of Scientific and Industrial Research. From 1965 to 1967, he served as chairman of the Science Research Council, the newly created agency that took on oversight of publicly funded scientific research from the Department of Scientific and Industrial Research. In 1967, he was appointed Principal of Queen Mary College. He retired in 1976.

Melville was president of the Faraday Society, the leading British society for the study of physical chemistry, from 1958 to 1960. He was president of the Chemical Society from 1966 to 1968.

In 1981, Melville became a founding member of the World Cultural Council.

== Later life ==
In retirement, Melville maintained his links with academia and research. He was appointed a part-time member of the London Electricity Board in 1968. He served as chair of the council of Westfield College between 1977 and 1983. He was also involved in fighting cuts to university funding.

Melville died on 14 June 2000, aged 92.

== Personal life ==
In 1942, Melville married Janet Marion Cameron; she survives him. They had two daughters.

== Honours ==
In 1935, Melville was awarded the Meldola Medal by the Institute of Chemistry. In 1955, he was awarded the Davy Medal by the Royal Society "in recognition of his distinguished work in physical chemistry and in polymer reactions". In 1955, he gave the Royal Institution Christmas Lectures on "Big Molecules". In 1956, he was awarded the Bakerian Medal by the Royal Society and gave its associated lecture; it was titled "Addition polymerization".

On 1 March 1937, Melville was elected a Fellow of the Royal Society of Edinburgh (FRSE). His proposers were James Pickering Kendall, John Edwin MacKenzie, Ernest Ludlam, and Thomas Bolam. He won the society's Bruce Preller Prize for 1943 and their Gunning Victoria Jubillee Prize for the period 1952–1956. In 1941, he was elected a Fellow of the Royal Society (FRS); aged 33, he was one of the youngest ever to be elected to the fellowship. In the 1958 New Year Honours, he was appointed a Knight Commander of the Order of the Bath (KCB) for his services as secretary of the Department of Scientific and Industrial Research, and therefore granted the title sir.

In 1959, Melville was awarded an honorary Doctor of Science (DSc) by the University of Exeter. In 1966, he was awarded an honorary DSc degree by Heriot-Watt University. In 1975, he was awarded an honorary degree by the University of Essex.

In 1990, the Melville Laboratory for Polymer Synthesis was established at the University of Cambridge, being named in his honour.
