= Niphoparmena kivuensis =

Scientific classification
- Kingdom: Animalia
- Phylum: Arthropoda
- Clade: Pancrustacea
- Class: Insecta
- Order: Coleoptera
- Suborder: Polyphaga
- Infraorder: Cucujiformia
- Family: Cerambycidae
- Genus: Niphoparmena
- Species: N. kivuensis

Binomial name
- Niphoparmena kivuensis (Breuning, 1939)

Synonyms
- Mecynome (Niphoparmena) kivuensis Breuning, 1939; Mecynome (Niphoparmena) burgeoni Breuning, 1939; Mecynome (Niphoparmena) rotundipennis Breuning, 1950; Mecynome (Niphoparmena) rufobrunnea Breuning, 1939

Species of beetle

Niphoparmena kivuensis is a species of beetle in the family Cerambycidae. It was described by Stephan von Breuning in 1939, originally under the genus Mecynome.

It is 6–8.5 mm long and 1.7–2.8 mm wide, and its type locality is Tshibinda, the Democratic Republic of the Congo. It is known from the Democratic Republic of the Congo, Burundi, Rwanda, and Uganda.

The synonym N. rufobrunnea's type location is the Nyamukubi Mountains, DRC; its original description recorded its length as 9 mm and its width as 2.7 mm. The synonym N. rotundipennis's type location is Rutshuru, DRC and its original description recorded its length as 10 mm and its width as 3.5 mm. The synonym N. burgeoni's type location is 36 km (22 mi) south of Lubero, DRC, and its original description recorded its length as 9 mm and its width as 3 mm. It was named in honor of Burgeon.
