= Enochrus blatchleyi =

Scientific classification
- Kingdom: Animalia
- Phylum: Arthropoda
- Clade: Pancrustacea
- Class: Insecta
- Order: Coleoptera
- Suborder: Polyphaga
- Infraorder: Staphyliniformia
- Family: Hydrophilidae
- Genus: Enochrus
- Species: E. blatchleyi

Binomial name
- Enochrus blatchleyi (Fall, 1924)

Species of beetle

Enochrus blatchleyi is a species of water scavenger beetle in the family Hydrophilidae. It is found in North America.
