= Niphoparmena flavescens =

Scientific classification
- Kingdom: Animalia
- Phylum: Arthropoda
- Class: Insecta
- Order: Coleoptera
- Suborder: Polyphaga
- Infraorder: Cucujiformia
- Family: Cerambycidae
- Genus: Niphoparmena
- Subgenus: Mimamblymora
- Species: N. flavescens

Binomial name
- Niphoparmena flavescens (Breuning, 1950)

Synonyms
- Mimamblymora flavescens Breuning, 1950; Niphoparmena aethiopica Breuning, 1974; Niphoparmena clarkei Breuning, 1974

Species of beetle

Niphoparmena flavescens is a species of longhorn beetle in the family Cerambycidae. It was described by Stephan von Breuning in 1950, originally under the subgenus Mimamblymora.
