= Niphoparmena scotti =

Scientific classification
- Kingdom: Animalia
- Phylum: Arthropoda
- Class: Insecta
- Order: Coleoptera
- Suborder: Polyphaga
- Infraorder: Cucujiformia
- Family: Cerambycidae
- Genus: Niphoparmena
- Species: N. scotti

Binomial name
- Niphoparmena scotti (Breuning, 1939)

Synonyms
- Mecynome (Niphoparmena) scotti Breuning, 1939

Species of beetle

Niphoparmena scotti is a species of beetle in the family Cerambycidae. It was described by Stephan von Breuning in 1939.

It is 6 mm long and 1.5 mm wide, and its type locality is the Aberdare Range, Kenya. It was named in honor of Hugh Scott.
