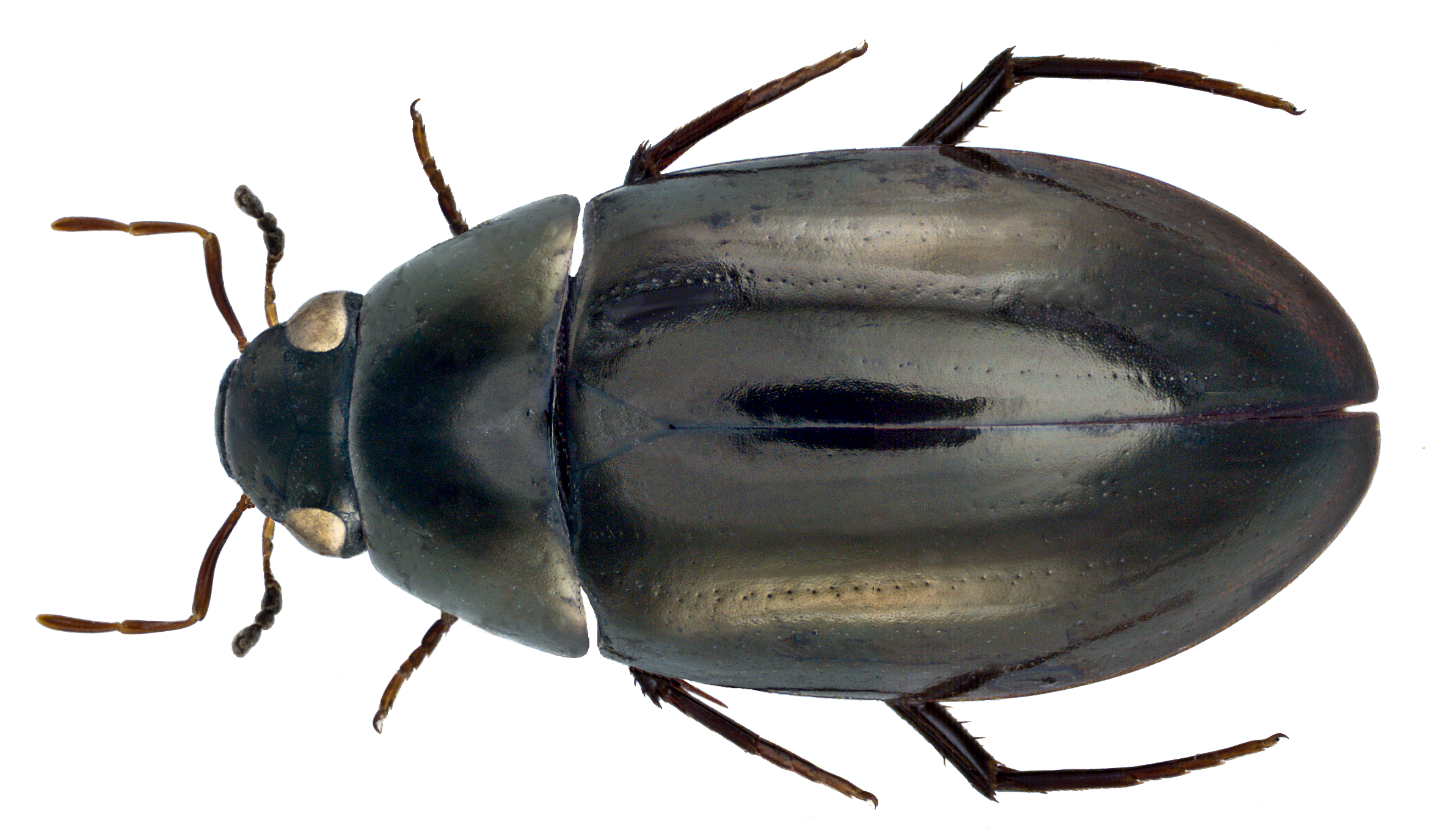
- S. inconspicuus from Sri Lanka

Scientific classification
- Domain: Eukaryota
- Kingdom: Animalia
- Phylum: Arthropoda
- Class: Insecta
- Order: Coleoptera
- Suborder: Polyphaga
- Infraorder: Staphyliniformia
- Family: Hydrophilidae
- Tribe: Hydrophilini
- Genus: Sternolophus; Solier, 1834

= Sternolophus =

Genus of beetles

Sternolophus is a genus of water scavenger beetles in the family Hydrophilidae containing nine described species in two subgenera.

== Species ==
These nine species belong to the genus Sternolophus:

- Subgenus Neosternolophus Zaitzev, 1909:
  - Sternolophus angolensis (Erichson, 1843)
  - Sternolophus australis Watts, 1989
  - Sternolophus immarginatus Orchymont, 1911
  - Sternolophus inconspicuus (Nietner, 1856)
  - Sternolophus marginicollis (Hope, 1841)
- Subgenus Sternolophus Solier, 1834:
  - Sternolophus decens Zaitzev, 1909
  - Sternolophus rufipes (Fabricius, 1792)
  - Sternolophus solieri Castelnau, 1840
  - Sternolophus unicolor Castelnau, 1840
