= Niphoparmena truncatipennis =

Scientific classification
- Kingdom: Animalia
- Phylum: Arthropoda
- Class: Insecta
- Order: Coleoptera
- Suborder: Polyphaga
- Infraorder: Cucujiformia
- Family: Cerambycidae
- Genus: Niphoparmena
- Species: N. truncatipennis

Binomial name
- Niphoparmena truncatipennis Breuning, 1956

Species of beetle

Niphoparmena truncatipennis is a species of beetle in the family Cerambycidae. It was described by Stephan von Breuning in 1956.
