= Enochrus hamiltoni =

Scientific classification
- Domain: Eukaryota
- Kingdom: Animalia
- Phylum: Arthropoda
- Class: Insecta
- Order: Coleoptera
- Suborder: Polyphaga
- Infraorder: Staphyliniformia
- Family: Hydrophilidae
- Genus: Enochrus
- Species: E. hamiltoni

Binomial name
- Enochrus hamiltoni (Horn, 1890)

Synonyms
- Enochrus collinus Brown, 1931; Enochrus conjunctus (Fall, 1901); Enochrus hamiltoni pacificus Leech, 1950; Enochrus hamiltoni pyretus Leech, 1950; Enochrus horni Leech, 1950

Species of beetle

Enochrus hamiltoni is a species of water scavenger beetle in the family Hydrophilidae. It is found in North America.
