= Niphoparmena albopilosa =

Scientific classification
- Domain: Eukaryota
- Kingdom: Animalia
- Phylum: Arthropoda
- Class: Insecta
- Order: Coleoptera
- Suborder: Polyphaga
- Infraorder: Cucujiformia
- Family: Cerambycidae
- Genus: Niphoparmena
- Species: N. albopilosa

Binomial name
- Niphoparmena albopilosa Aurivillius, 1908

Species of beetle

Niphoparmena albopilosa is a species of beetle in the family Cerambycidae. It was described by Per Olof Christopher Aurivillius in 1908.
