= Niphoparmena mycerinoides =

Scientific classification
- Kingdom: Animalia
- Phylum: Arthropoda
- Class: Insecta
- Order: Coleoptera
- Suborder: Polyphaga
- Infraorder: Cucujiformia
- Family: Cerambycidae
- Genus: Niphoparmena
- Species: N. mycerinoides

Binomial name
- Niphoparmena mycerinoides (Breuning, 1939)

Synonyms
- Mecynome (Niphoparmena) mycerinoides Breuning, 1939

Species of beetle

Niphoparmena mycerinoides is a species of beetle in the family Cerambycidae. It was described by Stephan von Breuning in 1939.

It is 8.5 mm long and 2.5 mm wide, and its type locality is Hola, Kenya.
