= List of fellows of the Royal Society elected in 1941 =

This article lists fellows of the Royal Society elected in 1941.

== Fellows ==
1. Noel Benson
2. Homi Jehangir Bhabha
3. Sir Edward Bullard
4. Sir Winston Churchill
5. Cyril Dean Darlington
6. Philip Ivor Dee
7. Sir Sheldon Francis Dudley
8. Sir John Carew Eccles
9. Howard Florey
10. Alan Arnold Griffith
11. Sir Harry Work Melville
12. Joseph Needham
13. Sir Albert Cherbury David Rivett
14. Alexander Robertson
15. Thomas Gerald Room
16. Arthur John Rowledge
17. Hugh Scott
18. Sir Franz Eugen Simon
19. Sir Henry Gerard Thornton
20. Sir Robert Alexander Watson-Watt
21. Philip Bruce White

== Foreign members ==
1. James Bryant Conant
2. Karl Landsteiner
