= Eunidia scotti =

Scientific classification
- Kingdom: Animalia
- Phylum: Arthropoda
- Clade: Pancrustacea
- Class: Insecta
- Order: Coleoptera
- Suborder: Polyphaga
- Infraorder: Cucujiformia
- Family: Cerambycidae
- Genus: Eunidia
- Species: E. scotti

Binomial name
- Eunidia scotti Breuning, 1939

Species of beetle

Eunidia scotti is a species of beetle in the family Cerambycidae. It was described by Stephan von Breuning in 1939.

It's 8.5 mm long and 2.25 mm wide, and its type locality is Dire Dawa, Ethiopia. It was named in honor of Hugh Scott.
