= Niphoparmena persimilis =

Scientific classification
- Kingdom: Animalia
- Phylum: Arthropoda
- Class: Insecta
- Order: Coleoptera
- Suborder: Polyphaga
- Infraorder: Cucujiformia
- Family: Cerambycidae
- Genus: Niphoparmena
- Species: N. persimilis

Binomial name
- Niphoparmena persimilis (Breuning, 1939)

Synonyms
- Mecynome (Niphoparmena) persimilis Breuning, 1939

Species of beetle

Niphoparmena persimilis is a species of beetle in the family Cerambycidae. It was described by Stephan von Breuning in 1939.

It is 7 mm long and 2 mm wide, and its type locality is Rutshuru.
