= Enochrus californicus =

Scientific classification
- Domain: Eukaryota
- Kingdom: Animalia
- Phylum: Arthropoda
- Class: Insecta
- Order: Coleoptera
- Suborder: Polyphaga
- Infraorder: Staphyliniformia
- Family: Hydrophilidae
- Genus: Enochrus
- Species: E. californicus

Binomial name
- Enochrus californicus (Horn, 1890)

Species of beetle

Enochrus californicus is a species of water scavenger beetle in the family Hydrophilidae. It is found in Central America and North America.
