= Niphoparmena minima =

Scientific classification
- Kingdom: Animalia
- Phylum: Arthropoda
- Clade: Pancrustacea
- Class: Insecta
- Order: Coleoptera
- Suborder: Polyphaga
- Infraorder: Cucujiformia
- Family: Cerambycidae
- Genus: Niphoparmena
- Species: N. minima

Binomial name
- Niphoparmena minima (Breuning, 1939)

Synonyms
- Mecynome (Trichoparmena) minima Breuning, 1939

Species of beetle

Niphoparmena minima is a species of beetle in the family Cerambycidae. It was described by Stephan von Breuning in 1939.

It's 4.5–5.7 mm (0.18–0.22 in) long and 1.3–1.7 mm (0.05–0.07 in) mm wide, and its type locality is Mount Kinangop.
