= Enochrus pygmaeus =

Scientific classification
- Kingdom: Animalia
- Phylum: Arthropoda
- Class: Insecta
- Order: Coleoptera
- Suborder: Polyphaga
- Infraorder: Staphyliniformia
- Family: Hydrophilidae
- Genus: Enochrus
- Species: E. pygmaeus

Binomial name
- Enochrus pygmaeus (Fabricius, 1792)

Species of beetle

Enochrus pygmaeus is a species of water scavenger beetle in the family Hydrophilidae. It is found in the Caribbean Sea, Central America, and North America.

== Subspecies ==
These three subspecies belong to the species Enochrus pygmaeus:

- Enochrus pygmaeus nebulosus (Say, 1824)
- Enochrus pygmaeus pectoralis (LeConte, 1855)
- Enochrus pygmaeus pygmaeus (Fabricius, 1792)
