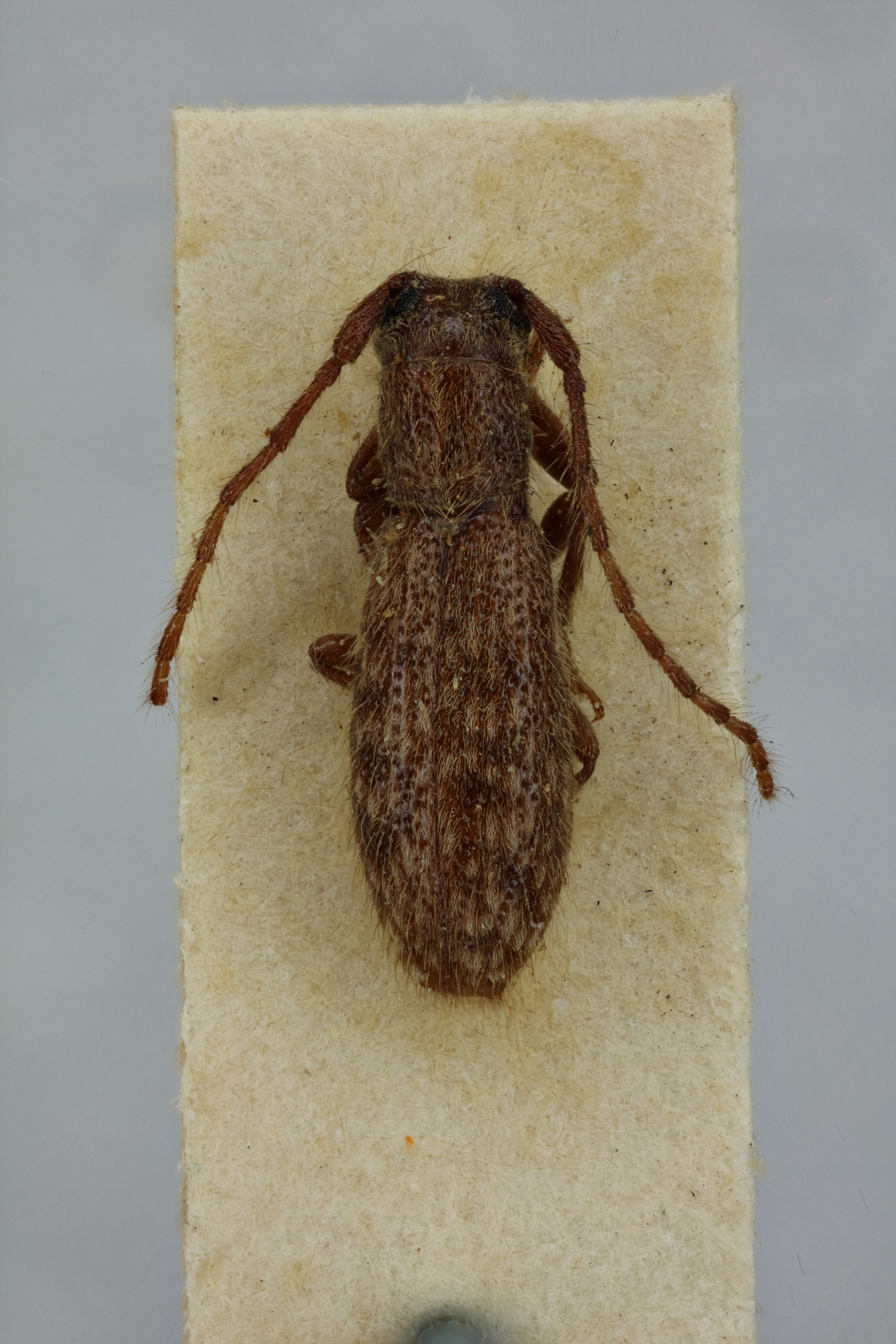

Scientific classification
- Kingdom: Animalia
- Phylum: Arthropoda
- Class: Insecta
- Order: Coleoptera
- Suborder: Polyphaga
- Infraorder: Cucujiformia
- Family: Cerambycidae
- Genus: Niphoparmena
- Species: N. abyssinica

Binomial name
- Niphoparmena abyssinica (Breuning, 1940)

= Niphoparmena abyssinica =

Species of beetle

Niphoparmena abyssinica is a species of beetle in the family Cerambycidae. It was described by Stephan von Breuning in 1940.
