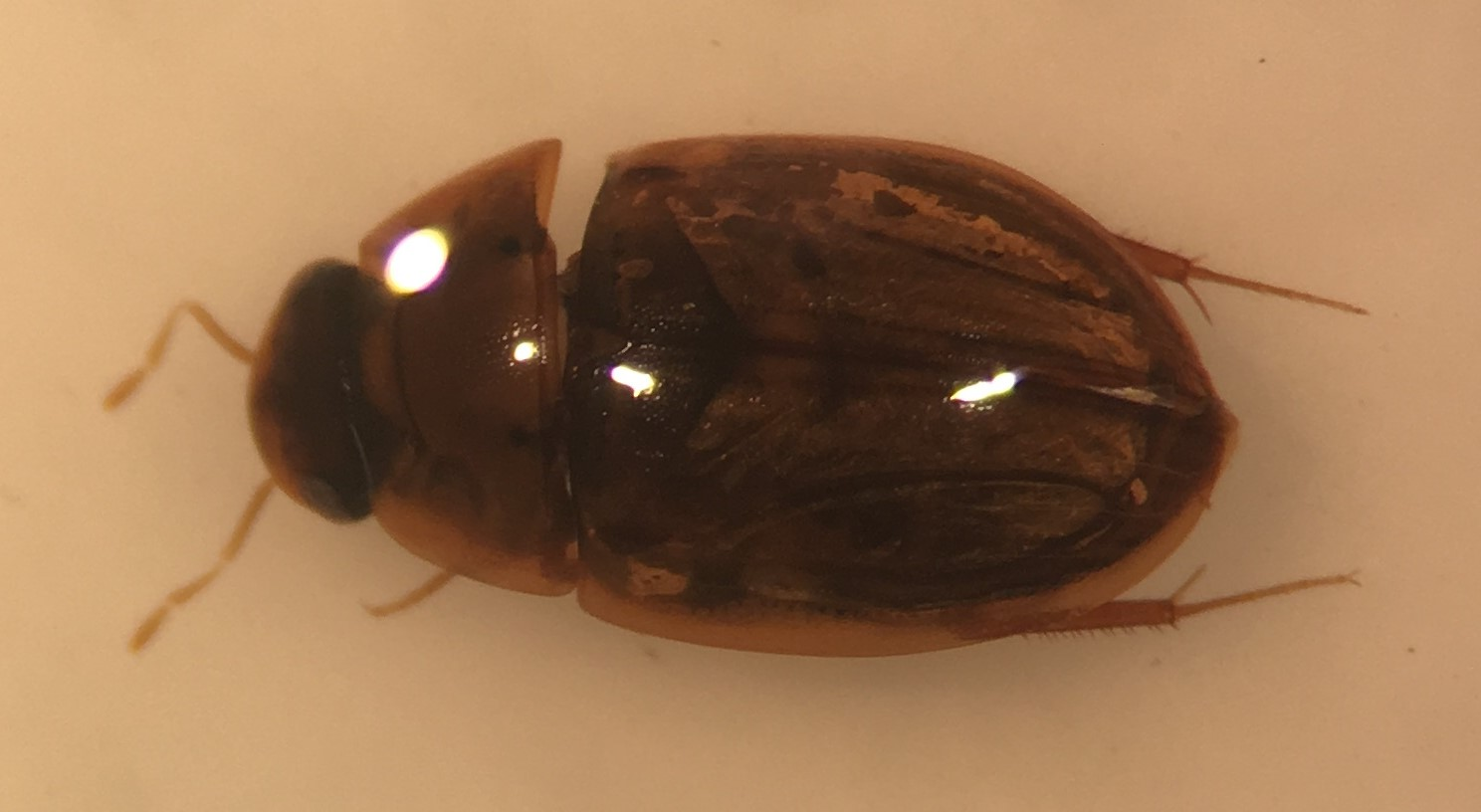

Scientific classification
- Domain: Eukaryota
- Kingdom: Animalia
- Phylum: Arthropoda
- Class: Insecta
- Order: Coleoptera
- Suborder: Polyphaga
- Infraorder: Staphyliniformia
- Family: Hydrophilidae
- Genus: Enochrus
- Species: E. ochraceus

Binomial name
- Enochrus ochraceus (Melsheimer, 1844)

= Enochrus ochraceus =

Species of beetle

Enochrus ochraceus is a species of water scavenger beetle in the family Hydrophilidae. It is found in the Caribbean Sea, Central America, and North America.
