= Niphoparmena flavoscutellata =

Scientific classification
- Kingdom: Animalia
- Phylum: Arthropoda
- Class: Insecta
- Order: Coleoptera
- Suborder: Polyphaga
- Infraorder: Cucujiformia
- Family: Cerambycidae
- Genus: Niphoparmena
- Species: N. flavoscutellata

Binomial name
- Niphoparmena flavoscutellata (Breuning, 1939)

Synonyms
- Mecynome (Niphoparmena) flavoscutellata Breuning, 1939

Species of beetle

Niphoparmena flavoscutellata is a species of beetle in the family Cerambycidae. It was described by Stephan von Breuning in 1939.

It is 9–11 mm long and 2.5–3 mm wide, and its type locality is Mount Meru, Tanzania.
