= Niphoparmena fuscomaculata =

Scientific classification
- Kingdom: Animalia
- Phylum: Arthropoda
- Class: Insecta
- Order: Coleoptera
- Suborder: Polyphaga
- Infraorder: Cucujiformia
- Family: Cerambycidae
- Genus: Niphoparmena
- Species: N. fuscomaculata

Binomial name
- Niphoparmena fuscomaculata (Villiers, 1940)

Species of beetle

Niphoparmena fuscomaculata is a species of beetle in the family Cerambycidae. It was described by Villiers in 1940.
