= Niphoparmena longicornis =

Scientific classification
- Kingdom: Animalia
- Phylum: Arthropoda
- Class: Insecta
- Order: Coleoptera
- Suborder: Polyphaga
- Infraorder: Cucujiformia
- Family: Cerambycidae
- Genus: Niphoparmena
- Species: N. longicornis

Binomial name
- Niphoparmena longicornis (Breuning, 1939)

Synonyms
- Mecynome (Niphoparmena) longicornis Breuning, 1939

Species of beetle

Niphoparmena longicornis is a species of beetle in the family Cerambycidae. It was described by Stephan von Breuning in 1939.

It's 7.5 mm long and 2.25 mm wide, and its type locality is Port Natal.
