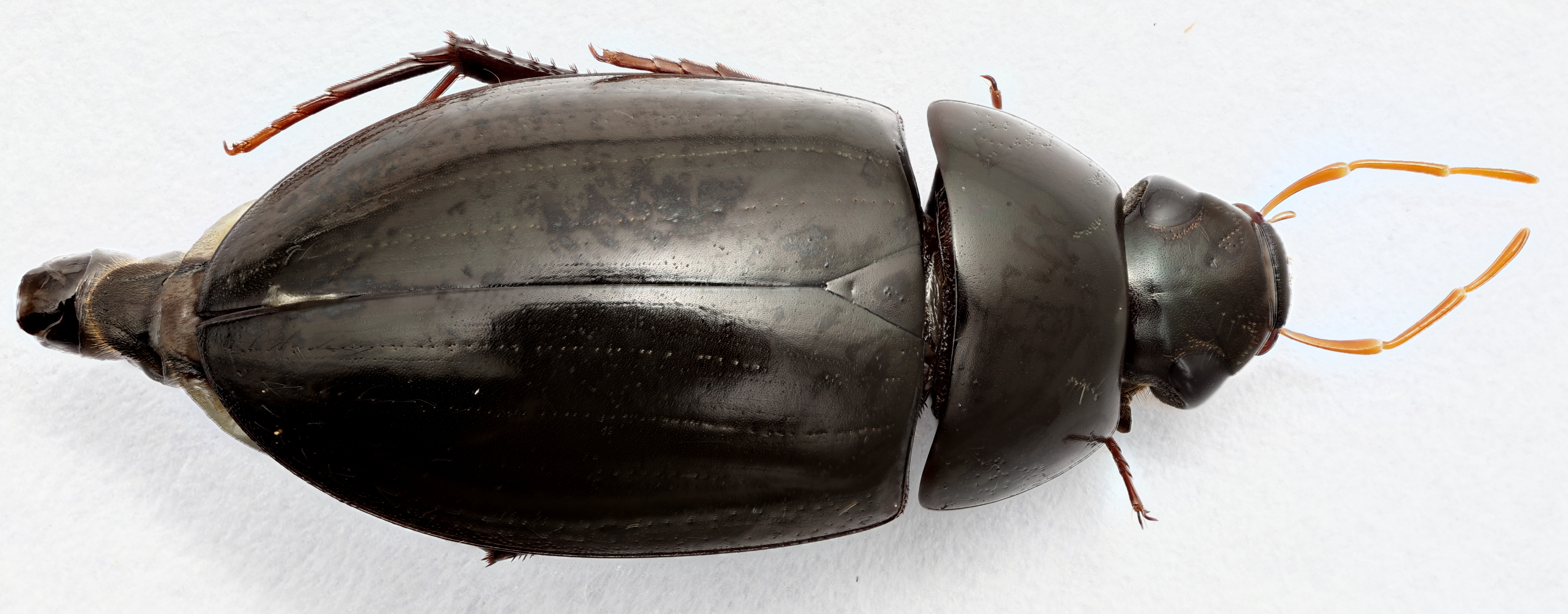

Scientific classification
- Kingdom: Animalia
- Phylum: Arthropoda
- Clade: Pancrustacea
- Class: Insecta
- Order: Coleoptera
- Suborder: Polyphaga
- Infraorder: Staphyliniformia
- Family: Hydrophilidae
- Genus: Hydrobiomorpha
- Species: H. phallica

Binomial name
- Hydrobiomorpha phallica (Orchymont, 1928)

= Hydrobiomorpha phallica =

Species of beetle

Hydrobiomorpha phallica is a species of water scavenger beetle in the family Hydrophilidae. It is found around the Caribbean, in part of the Antilles, Panama, and Venezuela.
