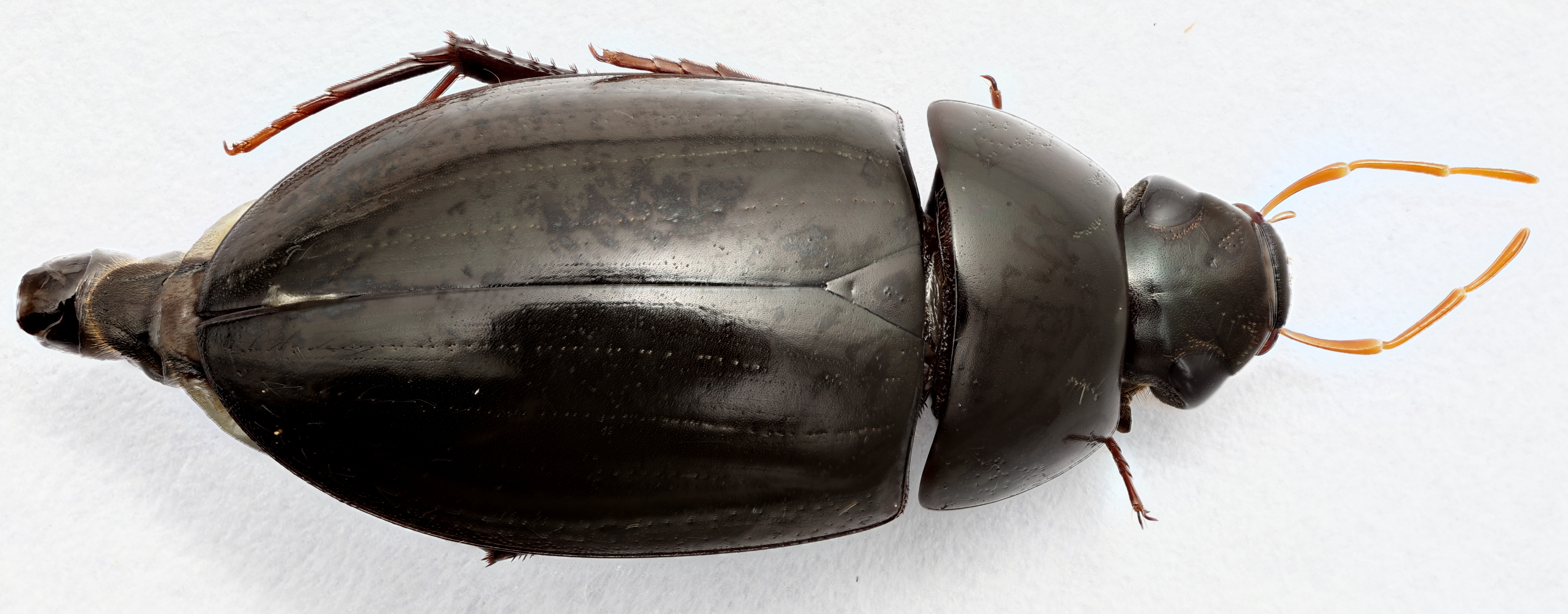
- Hydrobiomorpha phallica

Scientific classification
- Kingdom: Animalia
- Phylum: Arthropoda
- Class: Insecta
- Order: Coleoptera
- Suborder: Polyphaga
- Infraorder: Staphyliniformia
- Family: Hydrophilidae
- Tribe: Hydrophilini
- Genus: Hydrobiomorpha; Blackburn, 1888

Synonyms
- Neohydrophilus Orchymont, 1911

= Hydrobiomorpha =

Genus of beetles

Hydrobiomorpha is a genus of water scavenger beetles in the family Hydrophilidae. There are 56 extant described species in Hydrobiomorpha, along with several fossil species.

== Species ==
These 56 extant species belong to the genus Hydrobiomorpha:

- Hydrobiomorpha acutidens Bachmann, 1988
- Hydrobiomorpha bovilli Blackburn, 1888
- Hydrobiomorpha brasiliensis Bachmann, 1988
- Hydrobiomorpha cambodiensis (Régimbart, 1903)
- Hydrobiomorpha caratinga Bachmann, 1988
- Hydrobiomorpha casta (Say, 1835)
- Hydrobiomorpha celata Mouchamps, 1959
- Hydrobiomorpha colombica Mouchamps, 1959
- Hydrobiomorpha corumbaensis Mouchamps, 1959
- Hydrobiomorpha costera Bachmann, 1988
- Hydrobiomorpha cultrifera (Régimbart, 1903)
- Hydrobiomorpha davidsoni (Hebauer, 2006)
- Hydrobiomorpha debbae Watts, 1990
- Hydrobiomorpha denticulata Bachmann, 1988
- Hydrobiomorpha deplanata Orchymont, 1911
- Hydrobiomorpha distincta (Hope, 1843)
- Hydrobiomorpha franca Bachmann, 1988
- Hydrobiomorpha grandis (Castelnau, 1840)
- Hydrobiomorpha helenae Blakburn, 1890
- Hydrobiomorpha ignorata (Orchymont, 1928)
- Hydrobiomorpha iguazu Bachmann, 1988
- Hydrobiomorpha irina (Brullé, 1837)
- Hydrobiomorpha irinoides Bachmann, 1988
- Hydrobiomorpha isolata Mouchamps, 1959
- Hydrobiomorpha longa (Bruch, 1915)
- Hydrobiomorpha malaisica Mouchamps, 1959
- Hydrobiomorpha media (Brullé, 1837)
- Hydrobiomorpha microspina Watts, 1990
- Hydrobiomorpha mirabilis Mouchamps, 1959
- Hydrobiomorpha mucajai Bachmann, 1988
- Hydrobiomorpha naviga Short, 2004
- Hydrobiomorpha occidentalis (Balfour-Browne, 1939)
- Hydrobiomorpha paraensis Bachmann, 1988
- Hydrobiomorpha paulista Bachmann, 1988
- Hydrobiomorpha perissinottoi Bilton, 2016
- Hydrobiomorpha perssoni Hebauer, 2006
- Hydrobiomorpha phallica (Orchymont, 1928)
- Hydrobiomorpha polita (Castelnau, 1840)
- Hydrobiomorpha praesumptapolita Bachmann, 1988
- Hydrobiomorpha rudesculpta (Orchymont, 1939)
- Hydrobiomorpha rufiventris (Nietner, 1856)
- Hydrobiomorpha simplex Mouchamps, 1959
- Hydrobiomorpha solitaria Bachmann, 1988
- Hydrobiomorpha spatula Bachmann, 1988
- Hydrobiomorpha spiculosa Bachmann, 1988
- Hydrobiomorpha spinicollis (Eschscholtz, 1822)
- Hydrobiomorpha spinosa (Orchymont, 1928)
- Hydrobiomorpha straeleni (Balfour-Browne, 1950)
- Hydrobiomorpha tricornis Mouchamps, 1959
- Hydrobiomorpha trifasciata Mouchamps, 1959
- Hydrobiomorpha troxi Watts, 1990
- Hydrobiomorpha utiariti Bachmann, 1988
- Hydrobiomorpha utinga Bachmann, 1988
- Hydrobiomorpha venezolana Bachmann, 1969
- Hydrobiomorpha wencki (Paulino d'Oliveira, 1880)
- Hydrobiomorpha zetha (Balfour-Browne, 1950)

These extinct species are known only from fossils:

- †Hydrobiomorpha braunii (Heer, 1847)
- †Hydrobiomorpha enspelense Wedmann, 2000
- †Hydrobiomorpha eopalpalis Fikacek, Wedmann, & Schmied, 2010
- †Hydrobiomorpha fraterna (Von Heyden, 1859)
- †Hydrobiomorpha heeri Fikáček & Schmied, 2013
