= Hugh Scott (entomologist) =

British Entomologist (1885 – 1960)

Hugh Scott FRS (16 September 1885 – 1 November 1960) was a British entomologist and biogeographer.

Scott was educated privately and as an exhibitioner at Trinity College, Cambridge, where he read the natural sciences tripos. He became a Fellow of the Royal Society in 1941. He worked as curator of the Cambridge University Museum of Zoology and as assistant keeper in the Department of Entomology, British Museum (Natural History).

He was a close friend and coworker of G. Evelyn Hutchinson.

Taxa named after him include:

- Eunidia scotti Breuning, 1939
- Niphoparmena scotti (Breuning, 1939)
- Hugoscottia Knisch, 1922 (A subgenus of Enochrus)

== General references ==
- Thompson, W. R. (1961). "Hugh Scott. 1885–1960". Biographical Memoirs of Fellows of the Royal Society. 7: 229–242. doi:10.1098/rsbm.1961.0018. JSTOR 769409.
- Hindle, E. (1961). "Dr. Hugh Scott, Sc.D., F.R.S.". Obituary. The Geographical Journal. 127 (1): 142. JSTOR 1793264.
- Britton, E. B. (24 December 1960). "Dr. Hugh Scott, F.R.S." Obituaries. Nature. 188 (4756): 1070–1071. Bibcode:1960Natur.188.1070B. doi:10.1038/1881070a0.
- Benson, Robert B. (1960). "Dr. Hugh Scott". Obituary. Entomologist's Monthly Magazine. 96: 105.
- "Dr. Hugh Scott: Widely Travelled Entomologist". Obituary. The Times. No. 54918. London. 2 November 1960. p. 15.
