= Niphoparmena =

Scientific classification
- Domain: Eukaryota
- Kingdom: Animalia
- Phylum: Arthropoda
- Class: Insecta
- Order: Coleoptera
- Suborder: Polyphaga
- Infraorder: Cucujiformia
- Family: Cerambycidae
- Subfamily: Lamiinae
- Tribe: Morimopsini
- Genus: Niphoparmena; Aurivillius, 1904

Genus of beetles

Niphoparmena is a genus of longhorn beetles of the subfamily Lamiinae, containing the following species:

subgenus Glabroparmena

- Niphoparmena glabricollis Breuning, 1956

subgenus Microparmena

- Niphoparmena basilewskyi Breuning, 1960

subgenus Mimamblymora

- Niphoparmena flavescens (Breuning, 1950)

subgenus Niphoparmena

- Niphoparmena acutipennis Breuning, 1956
- Niphoparmena albopilosa Aurivillius, 1908
- Niphoparmena alluaudi (Villiers, 1940)
- Niphoparmena bispinosa Aurivillius, 1903
- Niphoparmena carayoni Breuning, 1969
- Niphoparmena carinipennis Breuning, 1958
- Niphoparmena densepuncticollis Breuning, 1960
- Niphoparmena dohertyi Breuning, 1970
- Niphoparmena elgonensis (Breuning, 1939)
- Niphoparmena flavoscutellata (Breuning, 1939)
- Niphoparmena fossulata Breuning, 1942
- Niphoparmena fuscomaculata (Villiers, 1940)
- Niphoparmena fuscostriata Breuning, 1958
- Niphoparmena grossepunctata Breuning, 1942
- Niphoparmena jeanneli (Villiers, 1940)
- Niphoparmena kenyensis (Breuning, 1939)
- Niphoparmena kivuensis (Breuning, 1939)
- Niphoparmena latifrons (Breuning, 1940)
- Niphoparmena leleupi Breuning, 1960
- Niphoparmena lindblomi Aurivillius, 1925
- Niphoparmena longespinipennis Breuning, 1970
- Niphoparmena longicornis (Breuning, 1939)
- Niphoparmena meruana Aurivillius, 1908
- Niphoparmena mycerinoides (Breuning, 1939)
- Niphoparmena obliquefasciata (Breuning, 1939)
- Niphoparmena persimilis (Breuning, 1939)
- Niphoparmena puncticollis (Villiers, 1940)
- Niphoparmena rougemonti Breuning, 1977
- Niphoparmena scotti (Breuning, 1939)
- Niphoparmena spinipennis (Breuning, 1939)
- Niphoparmena sublineata (Villiers, 1940)
- Niphoparmena truncatipennis Breuning, 1956
- Niphoparmena unicolor (Breuning, 1940)

subgenus Trichoparmena

- Niphoparmena abyssinica (Breuning, 1940)
- Niphoparmena convexa (Breuning, 1939)
- Niphoparmena cylindrica (Breuning, 1940)
- Niphoparmena densepunctata (Breuning, 1940)
- Niphoparmena elongata (Breuning, 1939)
- Niphoparmena elongatipennis Breuning, 1961
- Niphoparmena flavostictica (Villiers, 1940)
- Niphoparmena gracilis (Breuning, 1940)
- Niphoparmena kenyana (Breuning, 1940)
- Niphoparmena marmorata Breuning, 1961
- Niphoparmena minima (Breuning, 1939)
