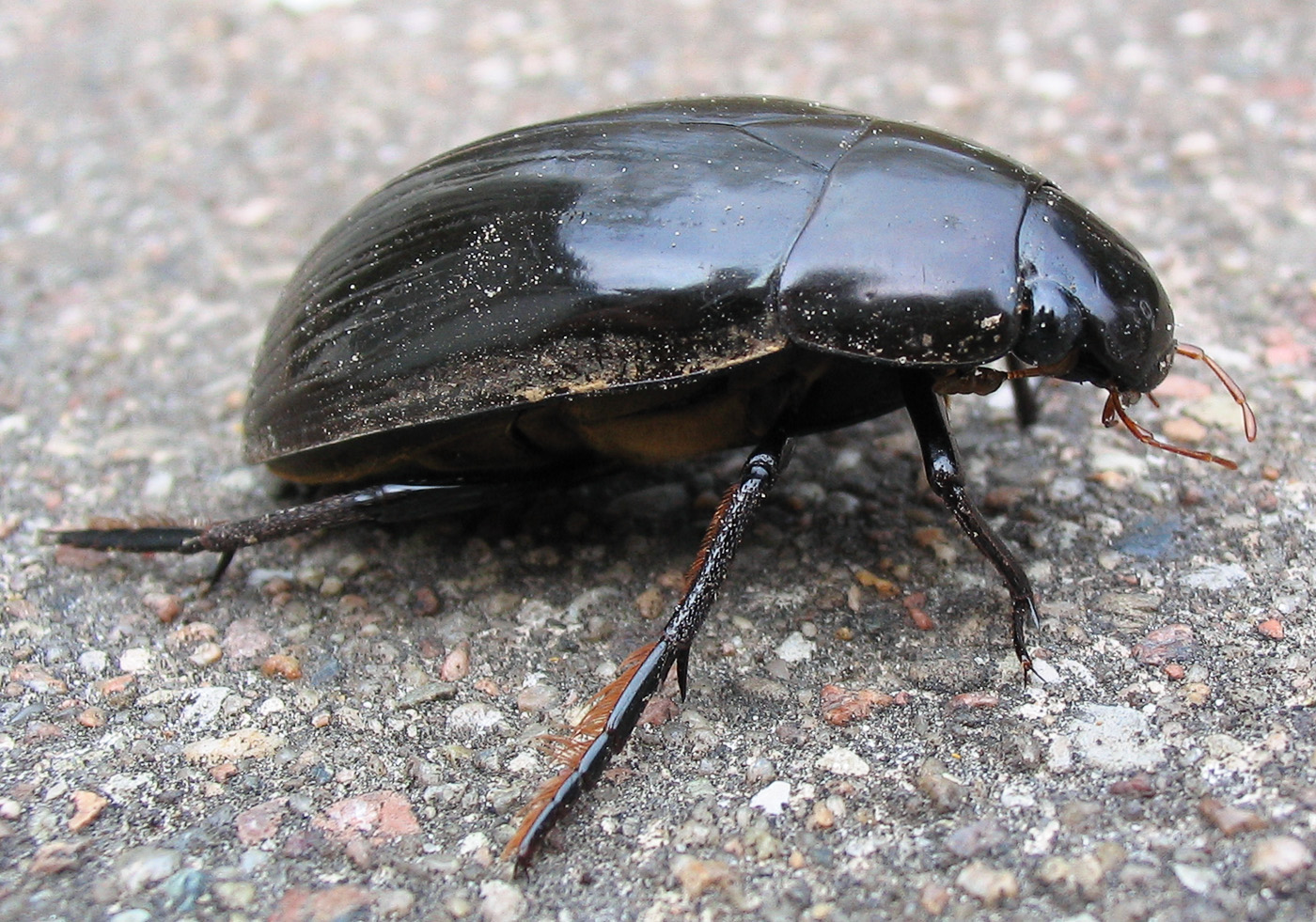
- Hydrophilus piceus

Scientific classification
- Kingdom: Animalia
- Phylum: Arthropoda
- Class: Insecta
- Order: Coleoptera
- Suborder: Polyphaga
- Infraorder: Staphyliniformia
- Family: Hydrophilidae
- Subfamily: Hydrophilinae
- Tribe: Hydrophilini; Latreille, 1802

= Hydrophilini =

Tribe of beetles

Hydrophilini is a tribe in the subfamily Hydrophilinae of aquatic beetles that contains 204 species in 7 genera.

== Genera ==
- Brownephilus
- Hydrobiomorpha
- Hydrochara
- Hydrophilus
- Protistolophus
- Sternolophus
- Tropisternus
