= Suphisellus rubripes =

Scientific classification
- Kingdom: Animalia
- Phylum: Arthropoda
- Class: Insecta
- Order: Coleoptera
- Suborder: Adephaga
- Family: Noteridae
- Genus: Suphisellus
- Species: S. rubripes

Binomial name
- Suphisellus rubripes (Boheman, 1858)

Species of beetle

Suphisellus rubripes is a species of burrowing water beetle in the subfamily Noterinae. It was described by Boheman in 1858 and is found in Argentina and Uruguay.
