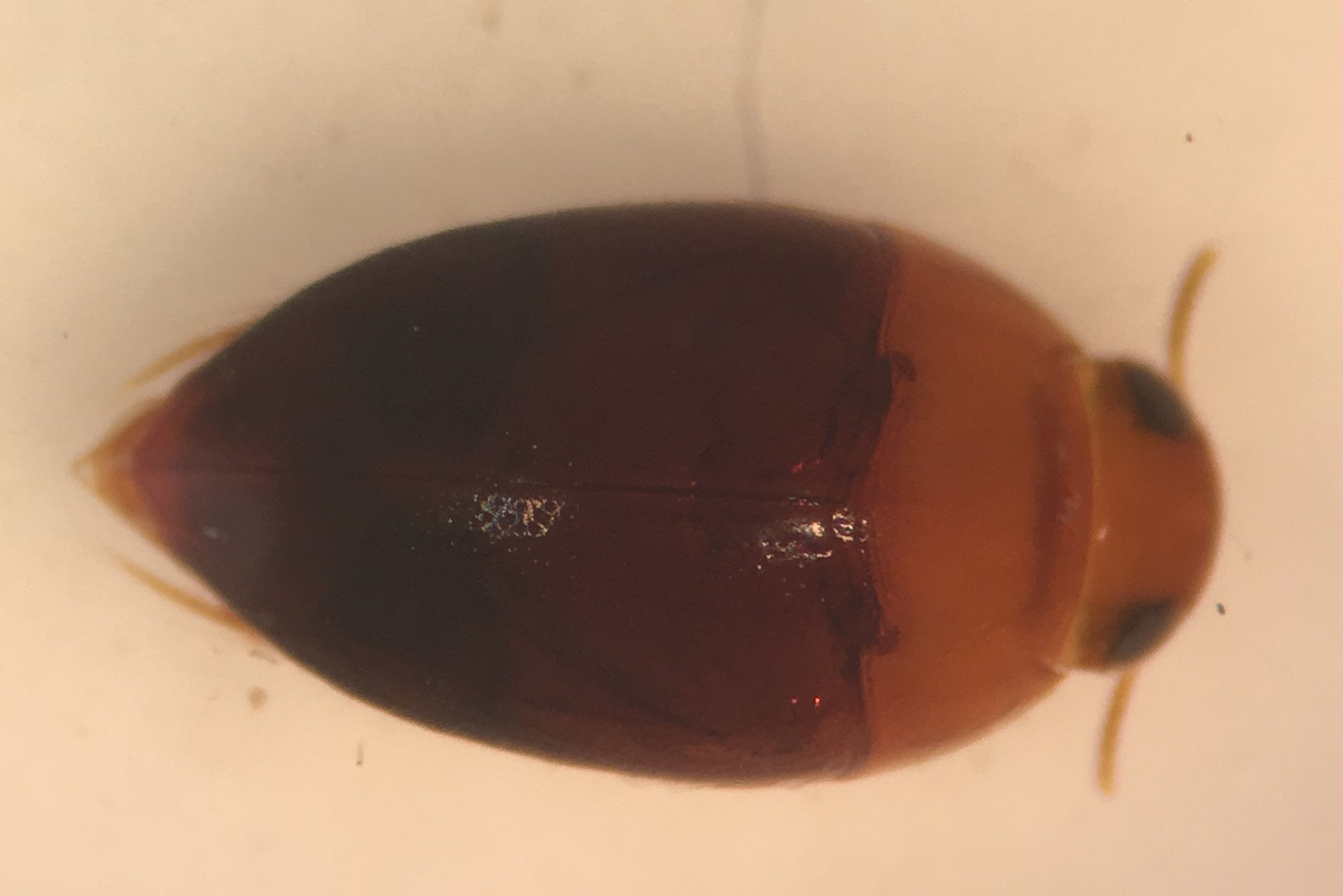

Scientific classification
- Domain: Eukaryota
- Kingdom: Animalia
- Phylum: Arthropoda
- Class: Insecta
- Order: Coleoptera
- Suborder: Adephaga
- Family: Noteridae
- Subfamily: Noterinae
- Genus: Suphisellus
- Species: S. bicolor

Binomial name
- Suphisellus bicolor (Say, 1830)

= Suphisellus bicolor =

Species of beetle

Suphisellus bicolor is a species of burrowing water beetle in the subfamily Noterinae. It was described by Thomas Say in 1830 and is found in the United States.
