= Liocanthydrus armulatus =

Scientific classification
- Domain: Eukaryota
- Kingdom: Animalia
- Phylum: Arthropoda
- Class: Insecta
- Order: Coleoptera
- Suborder: Adephaga
- Family: Noteridae
- Genus: Liocanthydrus
- Species: L. armulatus

Binomial name
- Liocanthydrus armulatus Baca et al., 2014

Species of beetle

Liocanthydrus armulatus is a species of water beetle in the family Noteridae. It is only known from the state of Bolívar, Venezuela.

Liocanthydrus armulatus measure 3.1–3.15 mm (0.122–0.124 in) in total length. The type series was collected from a stream margin.
