= Suphisellus nigrinus =

Scientific classification
- Domain: Eukaryota
- Kingdom: Animalia
- Phylum: Arthropoda
- Class: Insecta
- Order: Coleoptera
- Suborder: Adephaga
- Family: Noteridae
- Genus: Suphisellus
- Species: S. nigrinus

Binomial name
- Suphisellus nigrinus (Aubé, 1838)

Species of beetle

Suphisellus nigrinus is a species of burrowing water beetle in the subfamily Noterinae. It was described by Aubé in 1838 and is found in Antigua and Barbuda, Argentina, Bolivia, Brazil, Colombia, Costa Rica, Cuba, Ecuador, Guadeloupe, Guatemala, Jamaica, Mexico, Nicaragua, Panama, Paraguay, Suriname, Trinidad, Uruguay and Venezuela.
