= Suphisellus penthimus =

Scientific classification
- Kingdom: Animalia
- Phylum: Arthropoda
- Class: Insecta
- Order: Coleoptera
- Suborder: Adephaga
- Family: Noteridae
- Genus: Suphisellus
- Species: S. penthimus

Binomial name
- Suphisellus penthimus Guignot, 1957

Species of beetle

Suphisellus penthimus is a species of burrowing water beetle in the subfamily Noterinae. It was described by Félix Guignot in 1957 and is found in Brazil.
