= Suphisellus minimus =

Scientific classification
- Domain: Eukaryota
- Kingdom: Animalia
- Phylum: Arthropoda
- Class: Insecta
- Order: Coleoptera
- Suborder: Adephaga
- Family: Noteridae
- Genus: Suphisellus
- Species: S. minimus

Binomial name
- Suphisellus minimus Gschwendtner, 1922

Species of beetle

Suphisellus minimus is a species of burrowing water beetle in the subfamily Noterinae. It was described by Gschwendtner in 1922 and is found in Brazil.
