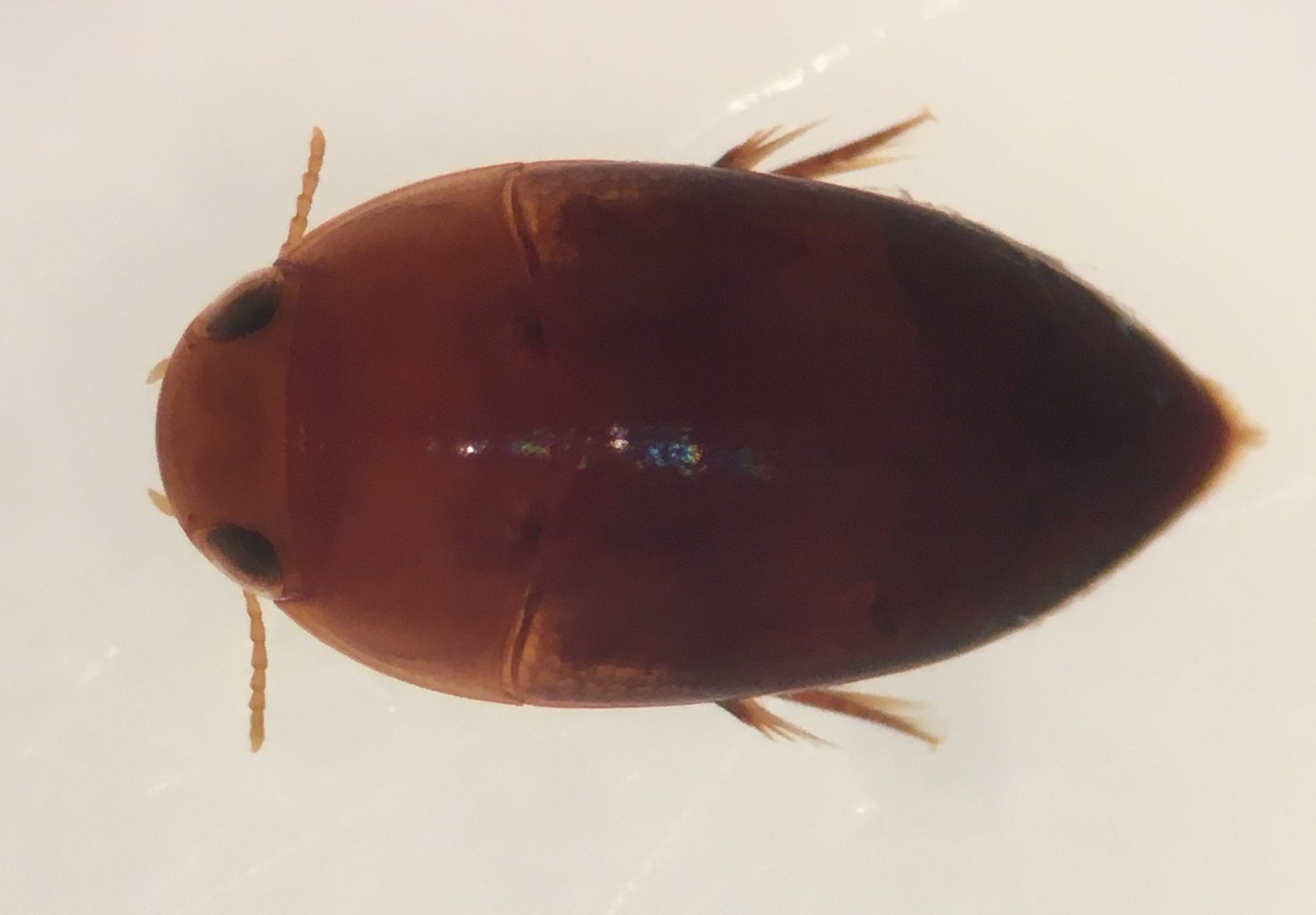

Scientific classification
- Kingdom: Animalia
- Phylum: Arthropoda
- Class: Insecta
- Order: Coleoptera
- Suborder: Adephaga
- Family: Noteridae
- Genus: Hydrocanthus
- Species: H. oblongus

Binomial name
- Hydrocanthus oblongus Sharp, 1882

= Hydrocanthus oblongus =

Species of beetle

Hydrocanthus oblongus is a species of burrowing water beetle in the family Noteridae. It is found in the Caribbean Sea and North America.
