= Suphisellus flavolineatus =

Scientific classification
- Domain: Eukaryota
- Kingdom: Animalia
- Phylum: Arthropoda
- Class: Insecta
- Order: Coleoptera
- Suborder: Adephaga
- Family: Noteridae
- Genus: Suphisellus
- Species: S. flavolineatus

Binomial name
- Suphisellus flavolineatus (Régimbart, 1889)

Species of beetle

Suphisellus flavolineatus is a species of burrowing water beetle in the subfamily Noterinae. It was described by Régimbart in 1889 and is found in Argentina and Brazil.
