= Suphisellus flavopictus =

Scientific classification
- Domain: Eukaryota
- Kingdom: Animalia
- Phylum: Arthropoda
- Class: Insecta
- Order: Coleoptera
- Suborder: Adephaga
- Family: Noteridae
- Genus: Suphisellus
- Species: S. flavopictus

Binomial name
- Suphisellus flavopictus (Régimbart, 1889)

Species of beetle

Suphisellus flavopictus is a species of burrowing water beetle in the subfamily Noterinae. It was described by Régimbart in 1889 and is found in Argentina, Brazil, and Paraguay.
