= Liocanthydrus =

Scientific classification
- Kingdom: Animalia
- Phylum: Arthropoda
- Clade: Pancrustacea
- Class: Insecta
- Order: Coleoptera
- Suborder: Adephaga
- Family: Noteridae
- Genus: Liocanthydrus; Guignot, 1957

Type species
- Canthydrus angustus Guignot, 1957

Synonyms
- Siolius J. Balfour-Browne, 1969

Genus of beetles

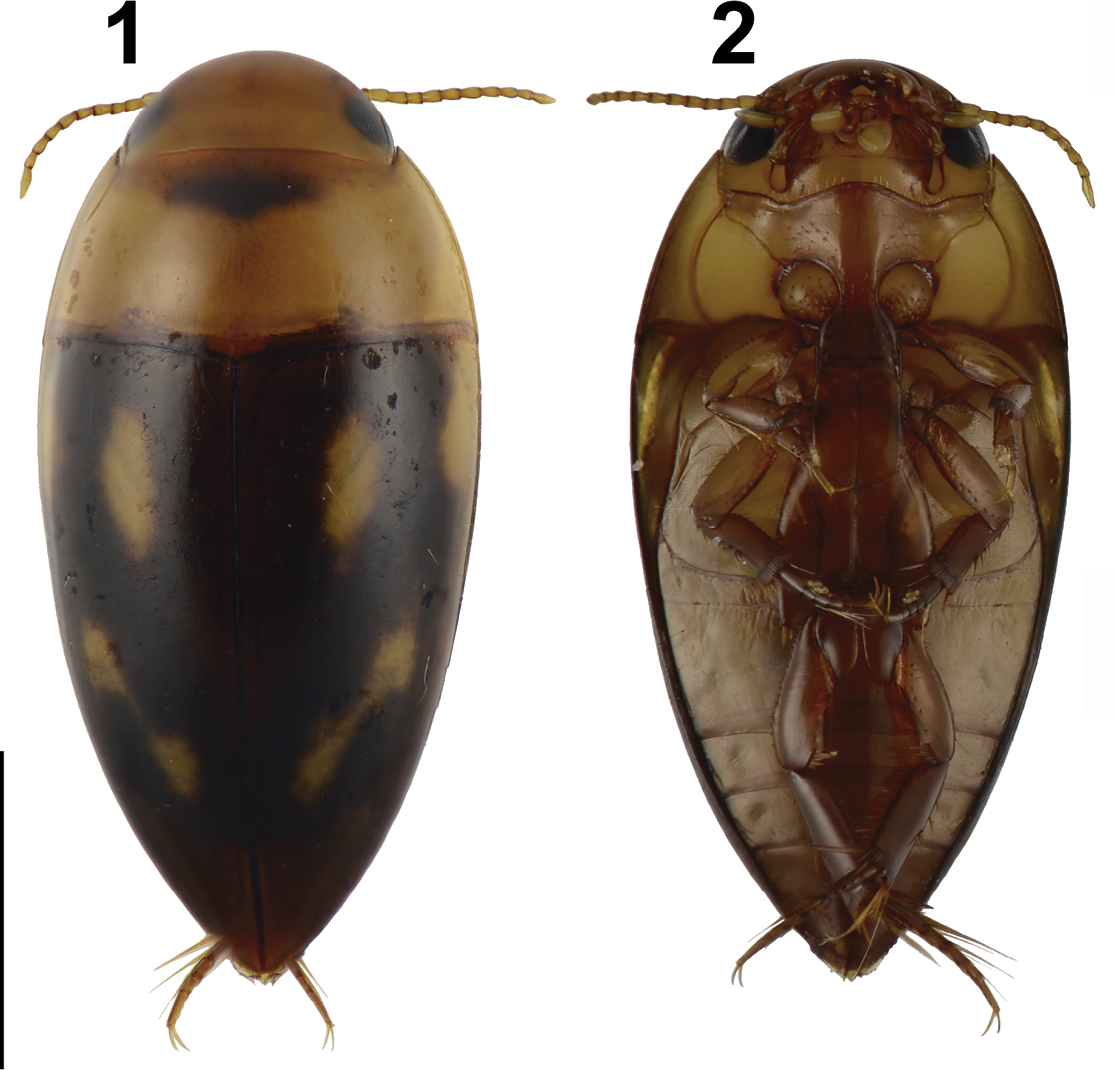
Liocanthydrus nanops, male, found in Argentina

Liocanthydrus is a genus of beetles belonging to the family Noteridae, the burrowing water beetles. The genus is Neotropical with records from Brazil, Venezuela, French Guiana, and Paraguay. It was originally established as a subgenus of the otherwise Old World genus Canthydrus.

== Description ==
Liocanthydrus are medium-sized beetles measuring 2.7–3.4 mm (0.11–0.13 in) in total length. The body is elongate, oval, weakly to moderately convex, and posteriorly attenuate. The appearance is very shiny. The elytra are iridescent and brown to nearly black. The pronotum and head coloration range from yellow to darker reddish brown.

== Ecology ==
Liocanthydrus are aquatic beetles most commonly collected in lotic (flowing-water) habitats. Specimens have typically been found along the margins of such habitats or in debris such as logs, leaf packs, or root mats. They are generally rare.

== Species ==
There are 11 recognized species:

- Liocanthydrus angustus (Guignot, 1957)
- Liocanthydrus armulatus Baca, Gustafson, Toledo and Miller, 2014
- Liocanthydrus bicolor (J. Balfour-Browne, 1969)
- Liocanthydrus clayae (J. Balfour-Browne, 1969)
- Liocanthydrus distintus García, Camacho and Poleo, 2018
- Liocanthydrus mecespilus Guimarães and Ferreira-Jr., 2015
- Liocanthydrus nanops Baca, Gustafson, Toledo and Miller, 2014
- Liocanthydrus octoguttatus (Zimmermann, 1921)
- Liocanthydrus ramosae García, Camacho and Poleo, 2018
- Liocanthydrus uniformis (Zimmermann, 1921)
- Liocanthydrus zanclus Guimarães and Ferreira-Jr., 2015
