= Canthydrus festivus =

Scientific classification
- Domain: Eukaryota
- Kingdom: Animalia
- Phylum: Arthropoda
- Class: Insecta
- Order: Coleoptera
- Suborder: Adephaga
- Family: Noteridae
- Genus: Canthydrus
- Species: C. festivus

Binomial name
- Canthydrus festivus Régimbart, 1888

Species of beetle

Canthydrus festivus is a species of burrowing water beetle in the family Noteridae. It is found in North America.
