= Suphisellus melzeri =

Scientific classification
- Domain: Eukaryota
- Kingdom: Animalia
- Phylum: Arthropoda
- Class: Insecta
- Order: Coleoptera
- Suborder: Adephaga
- Family: Noteridae
- Genus: Suphisellus
- Species: S. melzeri

Binomial name
- Suphisellus melzeri Zimmermann, 1925

Species of beetle

Suphisellus melzeri is a species of burrowing water beetle in the subfamily Noterinae. It was described by Zimmermann in 1925 and is found in Brazil.
