= Suphisellus levis =

Scientific classification
- Domain: Eukaryota
- Kingdom: Animalia
- Phylum: Arthropoda
- Class: Insecta
- Order: Coleoptera
- Suborder: Adephaga
- Family: Noteridae
- Genus: Suphisellus
- Species: S. levis

Binomial name
- Suphisellus levis (Fall, 1909)

Species of beetle

Suphisellus levis is a species of burrowing water beetle in the subfamily Noterinae. It was described by Fall in 1909 and is found in Mexico.
