= Suphisellus lineatus =

Scientific classification
- Domain: Eukaryota
- Kingdom: Animalia
- Phylum: Arthropoda
- Class: Insecta
- Order: Coleoptera
- Suborder: Adephaga
- Family: Noteridae
- Genus: Suphisellus
- Species: S. lineatus

Binomial name
- Suphisellus lineatus (Horn, 1871)

Species of beetle

Suphisellus lineatus is a species of burrowing water beetle in the subfamily Noterinae. It was described by George Henry Horn in 1871 and is found in Belize, Guatemala, Mexico and the United States.
