= Suphisellus canthydroides =

Scientific classification
- Kingdom: Animalia
- Phylum: Arthropoda
- Class: Insecta
- Order: Coleoptera
- Suborder: Adephaga
- Family: Noteridae
- Genus: Suphisellus
- Species: S. canthydroides

Binomial name
- Suphisellus canthydroides Guignot, 1940

Species of beetle

Suphisellus canthydroides is a species of burrowing water beetle in the subfamily Noterinae. It was described by Félix Guignot in 1940 and is found in Brazil.
