= Suphisellus parsonsi =

Scientific classification
- Kingdom: Animalia
- Phylum: Arthropoda
- Class: Insecta
- Order: Coleoptera
- Suborder: Adephaga
- Family: Noteridae
- Genus: Suphisellus
- Species: S. parsonsi

Binomial name
- Suphisellus parsonsi Young, 1952

Species of beetle

Suphisellus parsonsi is a species of burrowing water beetle in the subfamily Noterinae. It was described by Young in 1952 and is found in the United States.
