= Suphisellus insularis =

Scientific classification
- Kingdom: Animalia
- Phylum: Arthropoda
- Class: Insecta
- Order: Coleoptera
- Suborder: Adephaga
- Family: Noteridae
- Genus: Suphisellus
- Species: S. insularis

Binomial name
- Suphisellus insularis (Sharp, 1882)

Species of beetle

Suphisellus insularis is a species of burrowing water beetle in the subfamily Noterinae. It was described by Sharp in 1882 and is found in Cuba, the Dominican Republic, Guatemala, Haiti, Mexico, Puerto Rico and the United States.
