= Suphisellus neglectus =

Scientific classification
- Domain: Eukaryota
- Kingdom: Animalia
- Phylum: Arthropoda
- Class: Insecta
- Order: Coleoptera
- Suborder: Adephaga
- Family: Noteridae
- Genus: Suphisellus
- Species: S. neglectus

Binomial name
- Suphisellus neglectus Young, 1979

Species of beetle

Suphisellus neglectus is a species of burrowing water beetle in the subfamily Noterinae. It was described by Young in 1979 and is found in Belize, Colombia, Guatemala, Mexico and Panama.
