= Suphisellus grammopterus =

Scientific classification
- Domain: Eukaryota
- Kingdom: Animalia
- Phylum: Arthropoda
- Class: Insecta
- Order: Coleoptera
- Suborder: Adephaga
- Family: Noteridae
- Genus: Suphisellus
- Species: S. grammopterus

Binomial name
- Suphisellus grammopterus (Régimbart, 1889)

Species of beetle

Suphisellus grammopterus is a species of burrowing water beetle in the subfamily Noterinae. It was described by Régimbart in 1889 and is found in Bolivia, Brazil and Venezuela.
