= Suphisellus puncticollis =

Scientific classification
- Domain: Eukaryota
- Kingdom: Animalia
- Phylum: Arthropoda
- Class: Insecta
- Order: Coleoptera
- Suborder: Adephaga
- Family: Noteridae
- Subfamily: Noterinae
- Genus: Suphisellus
- Species: S. puncticollis

Binomial name
- Suphisellus puncticollis (Crotch, 1873)

Species of beetle

Suphisellus puncticollis is a species of burrowing water beetle in the subfamily Noterinae. It was described by Crotch in 1873 and is found in Canada and the United States.
