= Suphisellus balzani =

Scientific classification
- Domain: Eukaryota
- Kingdom: Animalia
- Phylum: Arthropoda
- Class: Insecta
- Order: Coleoptera
- Suborder: Adephaga
- Family: Noteridae
- Genus: Suphisellus
- Species: S. balzani

Binomial name
- Suphisellus balzani (Régimbart, 1889)

Species of beetle

Suphisellus balzani is a species of burrowing water beetle in the subfamily Noterinae. It was described by Régimbart in 1889 and is found in Argentina, Brazil and Paraguay.
