= Suphisellus variicollis =

Scientific classification
- Domain: Eukaryota
- Kingdom: Animalia
- Phylum: Arthropoda
- Class: Insecta
- Order: Coleoptera
- Suborder: Adephaga
- Family: Noteridae
- Genus: Suphisellus
- Species: S. variicollis

Binomial name
- Suphisellus variicollis Zimmermann, 1921

Species of beetle

Suphisellus variicollis is a species of burrowing water beetle in the subfamily Noterinae. It was described by Zimmermann in 1921 and is found in Argentina, Bolivia and Brazil.
