= Suphisellus phenax =

Scientific classification
- Domain: Eukaryota
- Kingdom: Animalia
- Phylum: Arthropoda
- Class: Insecta
- Order: Coleoptera
- Suborder: Adephaga
- Family: Noteridae
- Genus: Suphisellus
- Species: S. phenax

Binomial name
- Suphisellus phenax Guignot, 1954

Species of beetle

Suphisellus phenax is a species of burrowing water beetle in the subfamily Noterinae. It was described by Guignot in 1954.
