= Suphisellus binotatus =

Scientific classification
- Domain: Eukaryota
- Kingdom: Animalia
- Phylum: Arthropoda
- Class: Insecta
- Order: Coleoptera
- Suborder: Adephaga
- Family: Noteridae
- Genus: Suphisellus
- Species: S. binotatus

Binomial name
- Suphisellus binotatus (Fleutiaux & Sallé, 1890)

Species of beetle

Suphisellus binotatus is a species of burrowing water beetle in the subfamily Noterinae. It was described by Fleutiaux & Sallé in 1890 and is found in Cuba, the Dominican Republic and Guadeloupe.
