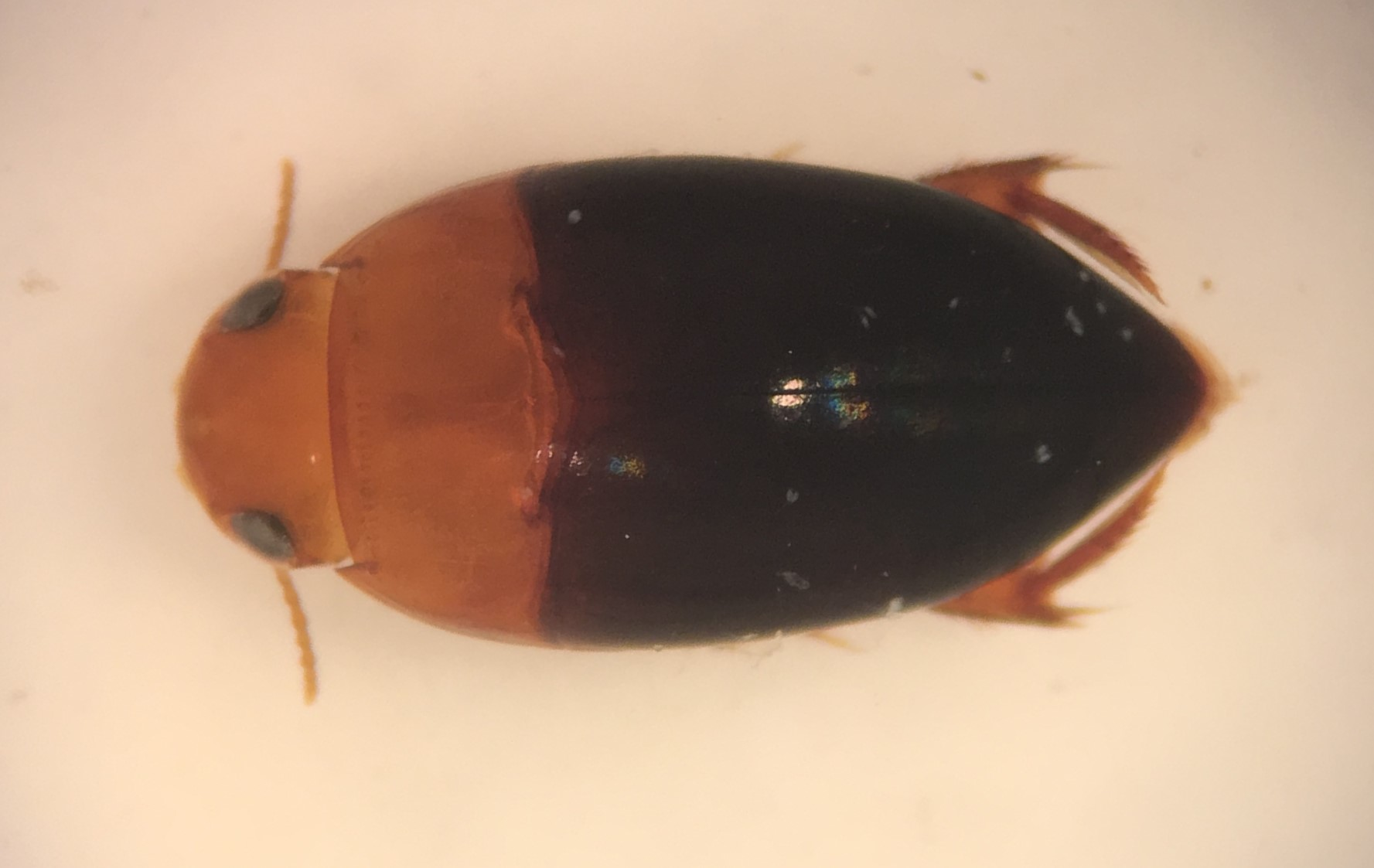

Scientific classification
- Domain: Eukaryota
- Kingdom: Animalia
- Phylum: Arthropoda
- Class: Insecta
- Order: Coleoptera
- Suborder: Adephaga
- Family: Noteridae
- Genus: Hydrocanthus
- Species: H. atripennis

Binomial name
- Hydrocanthus atripennis Say, 1834

= Hydrocanthus atripennis =

Species of beetle

Hydrocanthus atripennis is a species of burrowing water beetle in the family Noteridae. It is found in North America.
