= Suphisellus anticicollis =

Scientific classification
- Domain: Eukaryota
- Kingdom: Animalia
- Phylum: Arthropoda
- Class: Insecta
- Order: Coleoptera
- Suborder: Adephaga
- Family: Noteridae
- Genus: Suphisellus
- Species: S. anticicollis

Binomial name
- Suphisellus anticicollis Guignot, 1950

Species of beetle

Suphisellus anticicollis is a species of burrowing water beetle in the subfamily Noterinae. It was described by Félix Guignot in 1950 and is found in Ecuador.
