= Suphisellus obesus =

Scientific classification
- Domain: Eukaryota
- Kingdom: Animalia
- Phylum: Arthropoda
- Class: Insecta
- Order: Coleoptera
- Suborder: Adephaga
- Family: Noteridae
- Genus: Suphisellus
- Species: S. obesus

Binomial name
- Suphisellus obesus (Régimbart, 1903)

Species of beetle

Suphisellus obesus is a species of burrowing water beetle in the subfamily Noterinae. It was described by Régimbart in 1903 and is found in Argentina and Uruguay.
