= Suphisellus bruchi =

Scientific classification
- Domain: Eukaryota
- Kingdom: Animalia
- Phylum: Arthropoda
- Class: Insecta
- Order: Coleoptera
- Suborder: Adephaga
- Family: Noteridae
- Genus: Suphisellus
- Species: S. bruchi

Binomial name
- Suphisellus bruchi (Zimmermann, 1919)

Species of beetle

Suphisellus bruchi is a species of burrowing water beetle in the subfamily Noterinae. It was described by Zimmermann in 1919 and is found in Argentina and Brazil.
