= Liocanthydrus nanops =

Scientific classification
- Domain: Eukaryota
- Kingdom: Animalia
- Phylum: Arthropoda
- Class: Insecta
- Order: Coleoptera
- Suborder: Adephaga
- Family: Noteridae
- Genus: Liocanthydrus
- Species: L. nanops

Binomial name
- Liocanthydrus nanops Baca et al., 2014

Species of beetle

Liocanthydrus nanops is a species of water beetle in the family Noteridae. It is known from Paraguay and southern Brazil.

Liocanthydrus nanops measure 2.7–3.35 mm (0.106–0.132 in) in total length.
