= Suphisellus vicinus =

Scientific classification
- Domain: Eukaryota
- Kingdom: Animalia
- Phylum: Arthropoda
- Class: Insecta
- Order: Coleoptera
- Suborder: Adephaga
- Family: Noteridae
- Genus: Suphisellus
- Species: S. vicinus

Binomial name
- Suphisellus vicinus (Sharp, 1882)

Species of beetle

Suphisellus vicinus is a species of burrowing water beetle in the subfamily Noterinae. It was described by Sharp in 1882 and is found in Brazil.
