= Suphisellus semipunctatus =

Scientific classification
- Domain: Eukaryota
- Kingdom: Animalia
- Phylum: Arthropoda
- Class: Insecta
- Order: Coleoptera
- Suborder: Adephaga
- Family: Noteridae
- Genus: Suphisellus
- Species: S. semipunctatus

Binomial name
- Suphisellus semipunctatus (LeConte, 1878)

Synonyms
- Suphis semipunctatus LeConte, 1878; Pronoterus semipunctatus (LeConte, 1878)

Species of beetle

Suphisellus semipunctatus, formerly Pronoterus semipunctatus, is a species of burrowing water beetle in the family Noteridae. It is found in the eastern half of the United States, west to Texas and Michigan.

Suphisellus semipunctatus measure 2.3–2.6 mm (0.091–0.102 in) in length.
