= Suphisellus tenuicornis =

Scientific classification
- Kingdom: Animalia
- Phylum: Arthropoda
- Clade: Pancrustacea
- Class: Insecta
- Order: Coleoptera
- Suborder: Adephaga
- Family: Noteridae
- Genus: Suphisellus
- Species: S. tenuicornis

Binomial name
- Suphisellus tenuicornis (Chevrolat, 1863)

Species of beetle

Suphisellus tenuicornis is a species of burrowing water beetle in the subfamily Noterinae. It was described by Louis Alexandre Auguste Chevrolat in 1863 and is found in Cuba.
