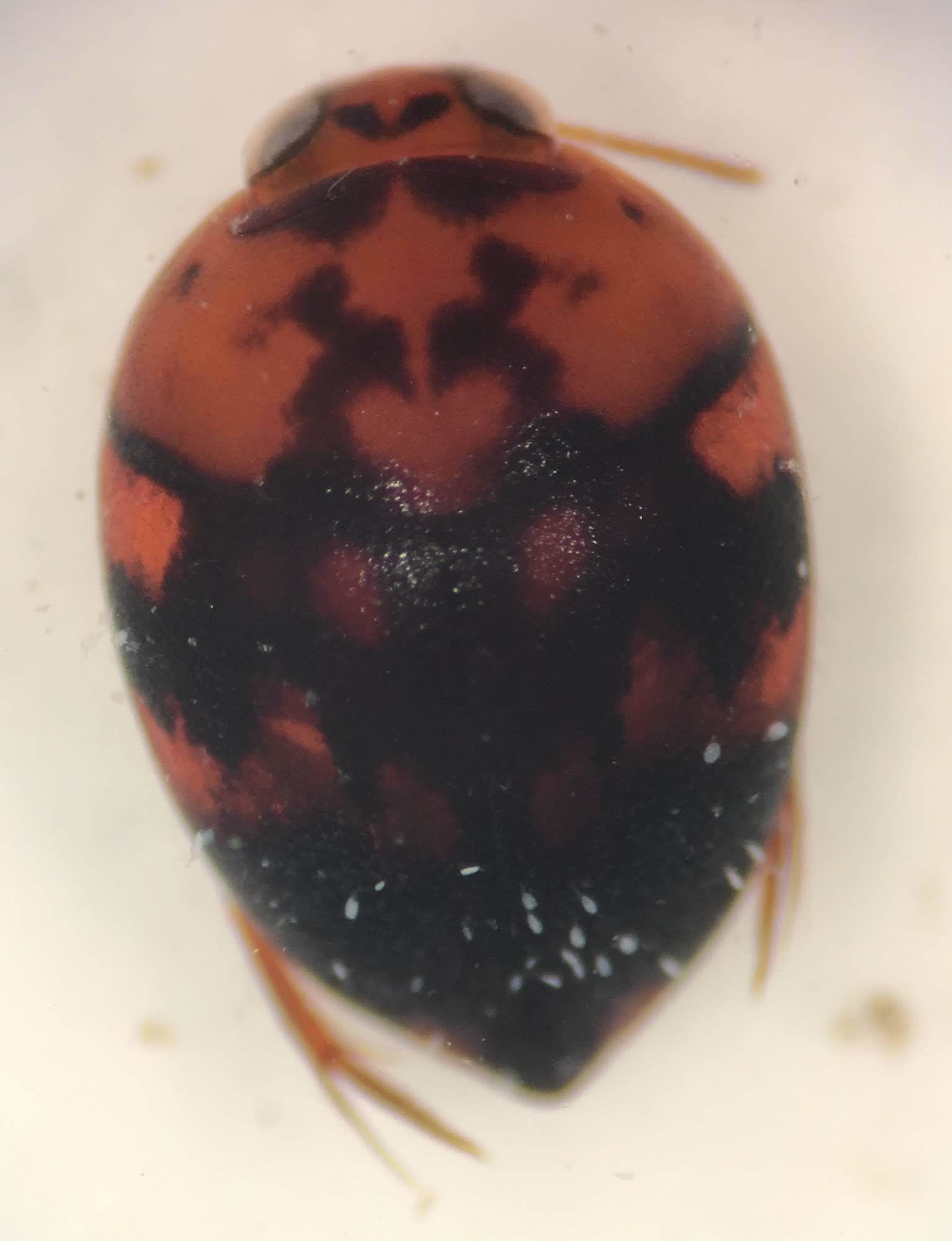

Scientific classification
- Kingdom: Animalia
- Phylum: Arthropoda
- Class: Insecta
- Order: Coleoptera
- Suborder: Adephaga
- Family: Noteridae
- Genus: Suphis
- Species: S. inflatus

Binomial name
- Suphis inflatus (LeConte, 1863)

Synonyms
- Colpius inflatus LeConte, 1863

= Suphis inflatus =

Species of beetle

Suphis inflatus is a species of burrowing water beetle in the family Noteridae. It is found in the Caribbean and North America.
