= Suphisellus gibbulus =

Scientific classification
- Domain: Eukaryota
- Kingdom: Animalia
- Phylum: Arthropoda
- Class: Insecta
- Order: Coleoptera
- Suborder: Adephaga
- Family: Noteridae
- Subfamily: Noterinae
- Genus: Suphisellus
- Species: S. gibbulus

Binomial name
- Suphisellus gibbulus (Aubé, 1838)

Species of beetle

Suphisellus gibbulus is a species of burrowing water beetle in the subfamily Noterinae. It was described by Aubé in 1838 and is found in the United States.
