= Suphisellus epleri =

Scientific classification
- Domain: Eukaryota
- Kingdom: Animalia
- Phylum: Arthropoda
- Class: Insecta
- Order: Coleoptera
- Suborder: Adephaga
- Family: Noteridae
- Genus: Suphisellus
- Species: S. epleri

Binomial name
- Suphisellus epleri Arce-Pérez & Baca, 2017

Species of beetle

Suphisellus epleri is a species of burrowing water beetle in the subfamily Noterinae. It was described by Arce-Pérez & Baca in 2017.
