= Speonoterus =

Speonoterus bedosae

Scientific classification
- Kingdom: Animalia
- Phylum: Arthropoda
- Class: Insecta
- Order: Coleoptera
- Suborder: Adephaga
- Family: Noteridae
- Genus: Speonoterus; Spangler, 1996
- Species: S. bedosae

Binomial name
- Speonoterus bedosae Spangler, 1996

Genus of insect

Speonoterus bedosae is a species of beetle in the family Noteridae, the only species in the genus Speonoterus.
