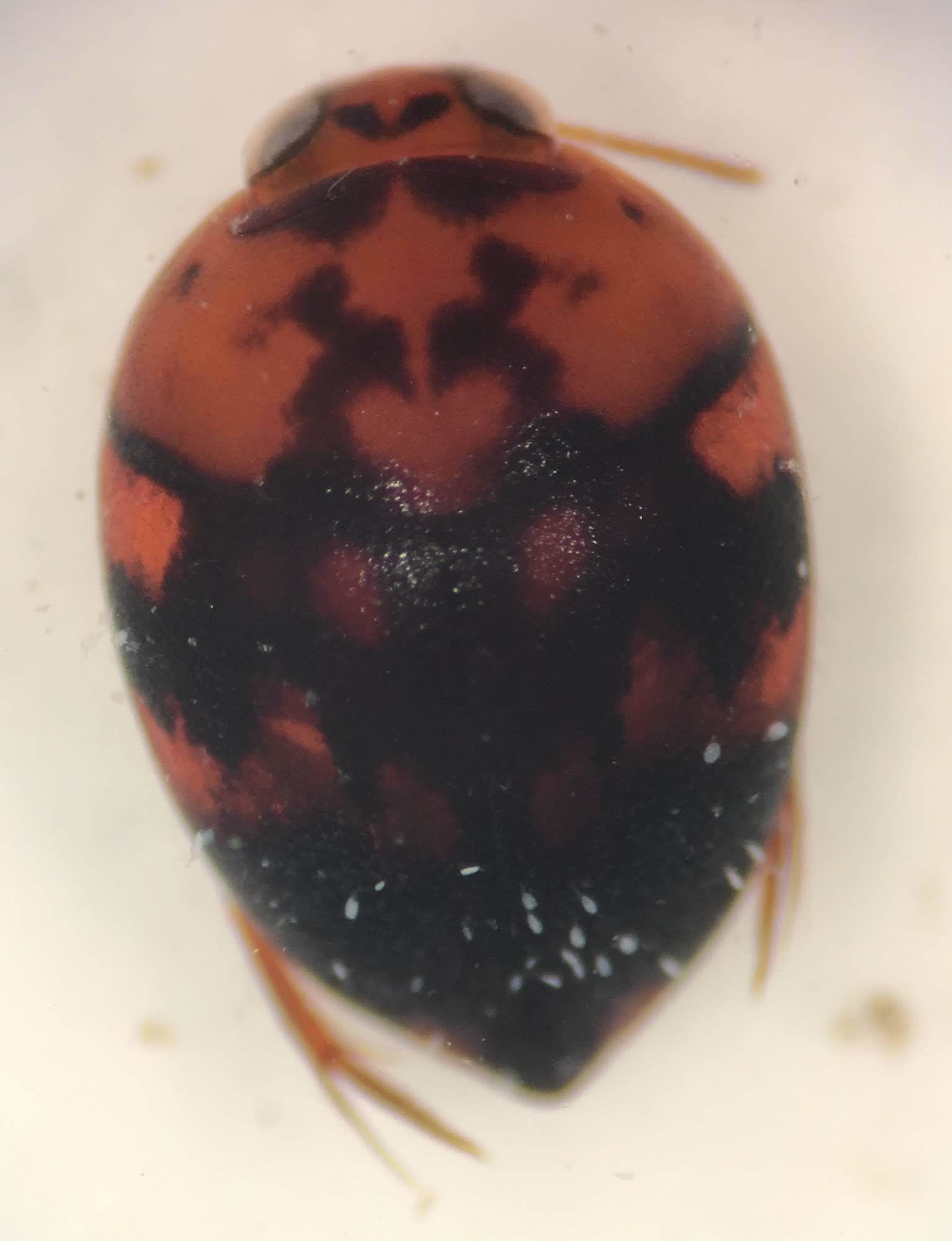

Scientific classification
- Kingdom: Animalia
- Phylum: Arthropoda
- Class: Insecta
- Order: Coleoptera
- Suborder: Adephaga
- Family: Noteridae
- Genus: Suphis; Aubé, 1836

= Suphis =

Genus of beetles

Suphis is a genus of beetles in the family Noteridae, containing the following species:

- Suphis cimicoides Aubé, 1837
- Suphis fluviatilis Guignot, 1948
- Suphis freudei Mouchamps, 1955
- Suphis globiformis Zimmermann, 1919
- Suphis inflatus (LeConte, 1863)
- Suphis insculpturatus Zimmermann, 1921
- Suphis intermedius Régimbart, 1903
- Suphis minutus Régimbart, 1903
- Suphis notaticollis Zimmermann, 1921
- Suphis ticky Grosso, 1993
- Suphis werneri Guignot, 1940
