= Phreatodytes =

Scientific classification
- Kingdom: Animalia
- Phylum: Arthropoda
- Class: Insecta
- Order: Coleoptera
- Suborder: Adephaga
- Family: Noteridae
- Genus: Phreatodytes; Uéno, 1957

Genus of beetles

Phreatodytes is a genus of beetles in the family Noteridae, containing the following species:

- Phreatodytes archaeicus Uéno, 1996
- Phreatodytes elongatus Uéno, 1996
- Phreatodytes latiusculus Uéno, 1996
- Phreatodytes mohrii Uéno, 1996
- Phreatodytes relictus Uéno, 1957
- Phreatodytes sublimbatus Uéno, 1996
