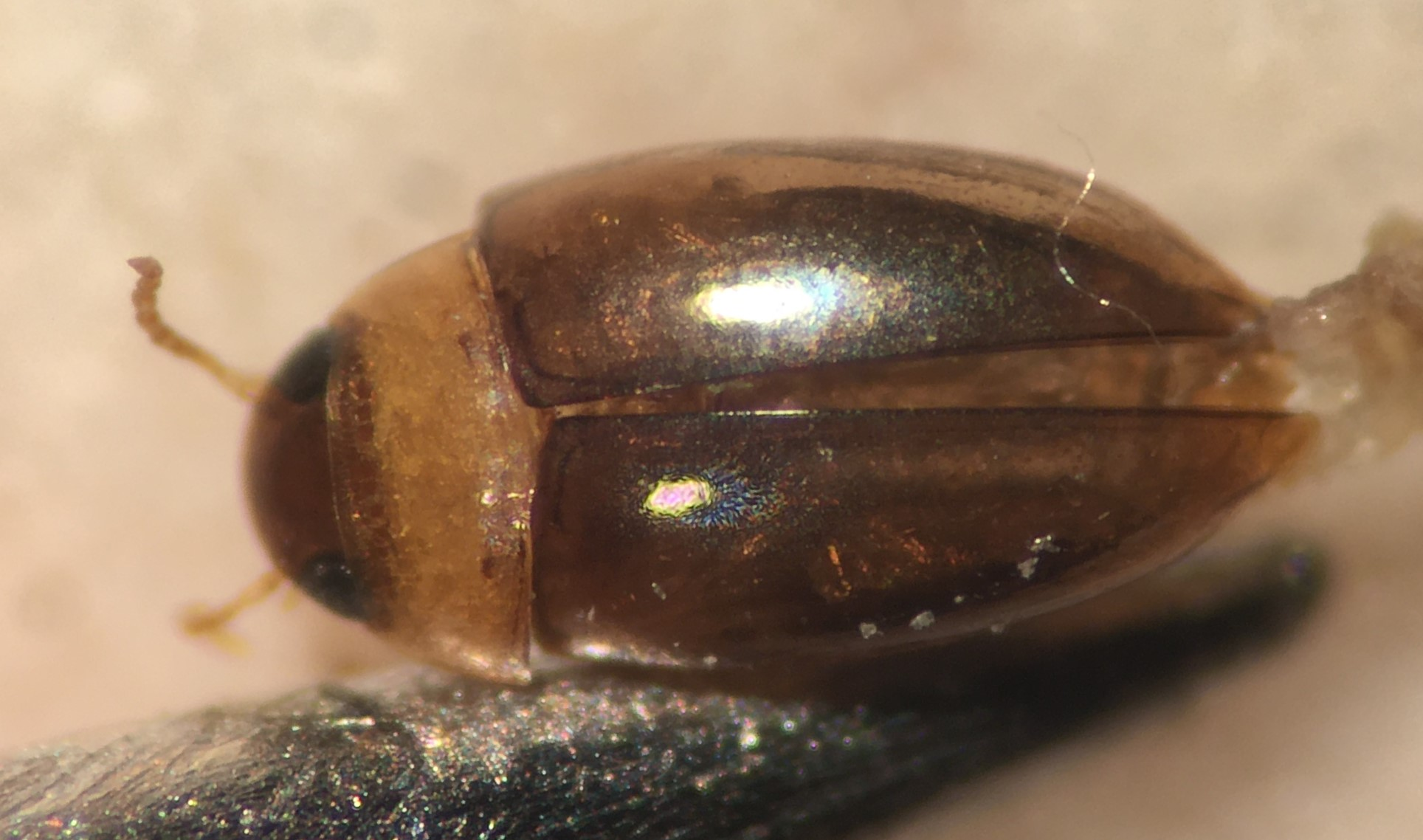
- Notomicrus sharpi, Florida

Scientific classification
- Kingdom: Animalia
- Phylum: Arthropoda
- Class: Insecta
- Order: Coleoptera
- Suborder: Adephaga
- Family: Noteridae
- Genus: Notomicrus; Sharp, 1882

= Notomicrus =

Genus of beetles

Notomicrus is a genus of beetles in the family Noteridae, containing the following species:

- Notomicrus brevicornis Sharp, 1882
- Notomicrus chailliei Manuel, 2015
- Notomicrus femineus Manuel, 2015
- Notomicrus gracilipes Sharp, 1882
- Notomicrus huttoni Young, 1978
- Notomicrus josiahi Miller, 2013
- Notomicrus malkini Young, 1978
- Notomicrus nanulus (LeConte, 1863)
- Notomicrus reticulatus Zimmermann, 1921
- Notomicrus sabrouxi Manuel, 2015
- Notomicrus sharpi J.Balfour-Browne, 1939
- Notomicrus tenellus (Clark, 1863)
- Notomicrus traili Sharp, 1882
