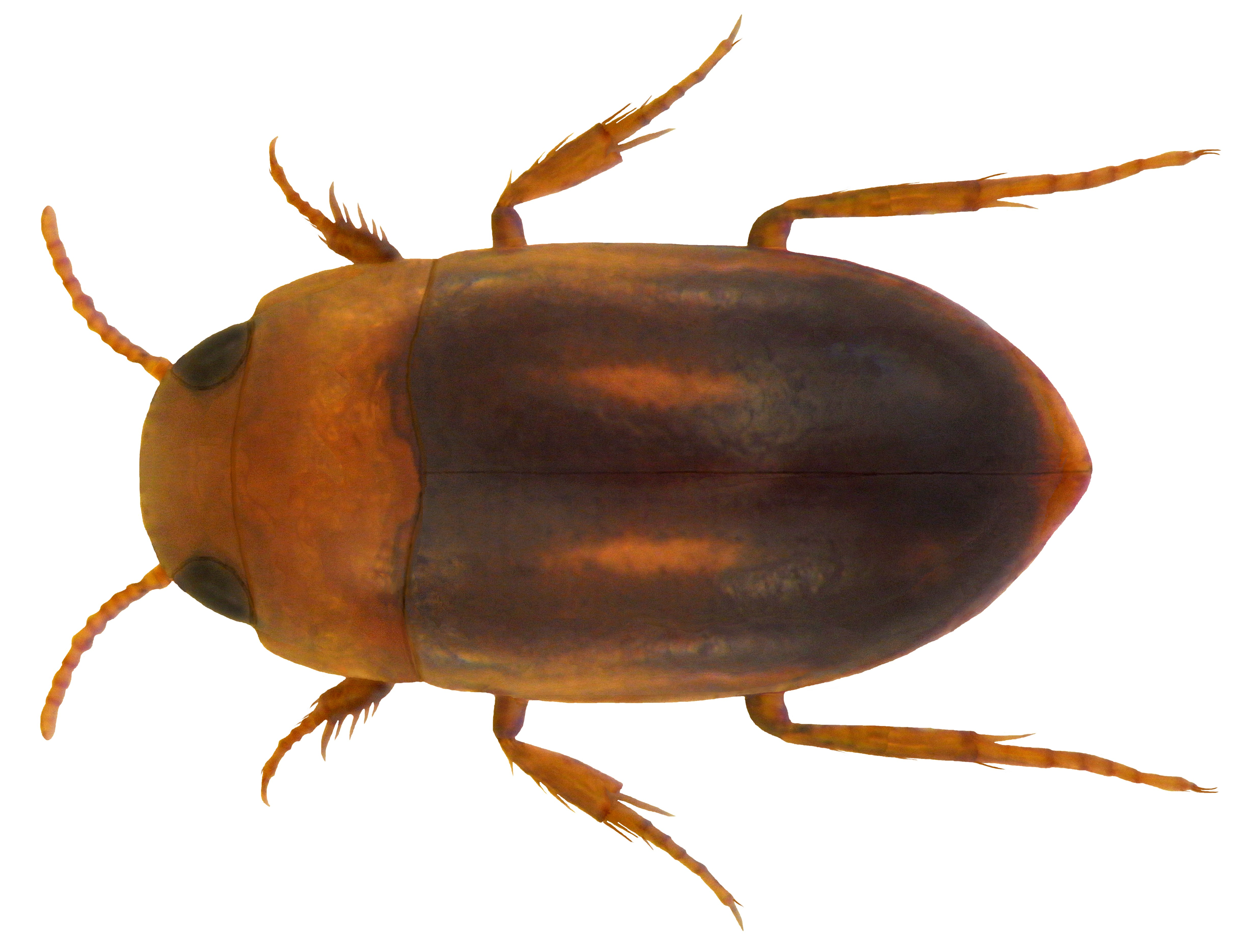
- Neohydrocoptus subvittulus

Scientific classification
- Kingdom: Animalia
- Phylum: Arthropoda
- Class: Insecta
- Order: Coleoptera
- Suborder: Adephaga
- Family: Noteridae
- Genus: Neohydrocoptus; Satô, 1972

= Neohydrocoptus =

Genus of beetles

Neohydrocoptus is a genus of beetles in the family Noteridae, containing the following species:

- Neohydrocoptus aethiopicus (J.Balfour-Browne, 1961)
- Neohydrocoptus africanus (Gschwendtner, 1930)
- Neohydrocoptus angolensis (Peschet, 1925)
- Neohydrocoptus badicus (Guignot, 1956)
- Neohydrocoptus bivittis (Motschulsky, 1859)
- Neohydrocoptus bosschae (Régimbart, 1892)
- Neohydrocoptus bradys (Guignot, 1955)
- Neohydrocoptus cunctans (Guignot, 1953)
- Neohydrocoptus dermotylus (Guignot, 1953)
- Neohydrocoptus distinctus (Wehncke, 1883)
- Neohydrocoptus freyi (J.Balfour-Browne, 1961)
- Neohydrocoptus frontalis (Régimbart, 1899)
- Neohydrocoptus garambanus (Guignot, 1958)
- Neohydrocoptus grandis (J.Balfour-Browne, 1961)
- Neohydrocoptus jaechi (Wewalka, 1989)
- Neohydrocoptus koppi (Wehncke, 1883)
- Neohydrocoptus megas (Omer-Cooper, 1957)
- Neohydrocoptus opatrinus (Régimbart, 1892)
- Neohydrocoptus placidus (Guignot, 1955)
- Neohydrocoptus rubescens (Clark, 1863)
- Neohydrocoptus rufulus (Motschulsky, 1859)
- Neohydrocoptus scapularis (Régimbart, 1899)
- Neohydrocoptus seriatus (Sharp, 1882)
- Neohydrocoptus sharpi (Wehncke, 1883)
- Neohydrocoptus subfasciatus (Sharp, 1882)
- Neohydrocoptus subvittulus (Motschulsky, 1859)
- Neohydrocoptus timidus (Guignot, 1956)
- Neohydrocoptus uellensis (Guignot, 1953)
