= Synchortus =

Scientific classification
- Kingdom: Animalia
- Phylum: Arthropoda
- Class: Insecta
- Order: Coleoptera
- Suborder: Adephaga
- Family: Noteridae
- Genus: Synchortus; Sharp, 1882

Genus of beetles

Synchortus is a genus of beetles in the family Noteridae, containing the following species:

- Synchortus abditus Guignot, 1959
- Synchortus asperatus (Fairmaire, 1869)
- Synchortus dabbenei Régimbart, 1895
- Synchortus desaegeri Gschwendtner, 1935
- Synchortus imbricatus (Klug, 1853)
- Synchortus leleupi Guignot, 1956
- Synchortus rugosopunctatus (Wehncke, 1876)
- Synchortus separatus Omer-Cooper, 1972
- Synchortus simplex Sharp, 1882
