= Mesonoterus =

Scientific classification
- Kingdom: Animalia
- Phylum: Arthropoda
- Class: Insecta
- Order: Coleoptera
- Suborder: Adephaga
- Family: Noteridae
- Genus: Mesonoterus; Sharp, 1882

Genus of beetles

Mesonoterus is a genus of beetles in the family Noteridae, containing the following species:

- Mesonoterus addendus (Blatchley, 1920)
- Mesonoterus crassicornis (Régimbart, 1889)
- Mesonoterus grandicornis (Régimbart, 1899)
- Mesonoterus laevicollis Sharp, 1882
