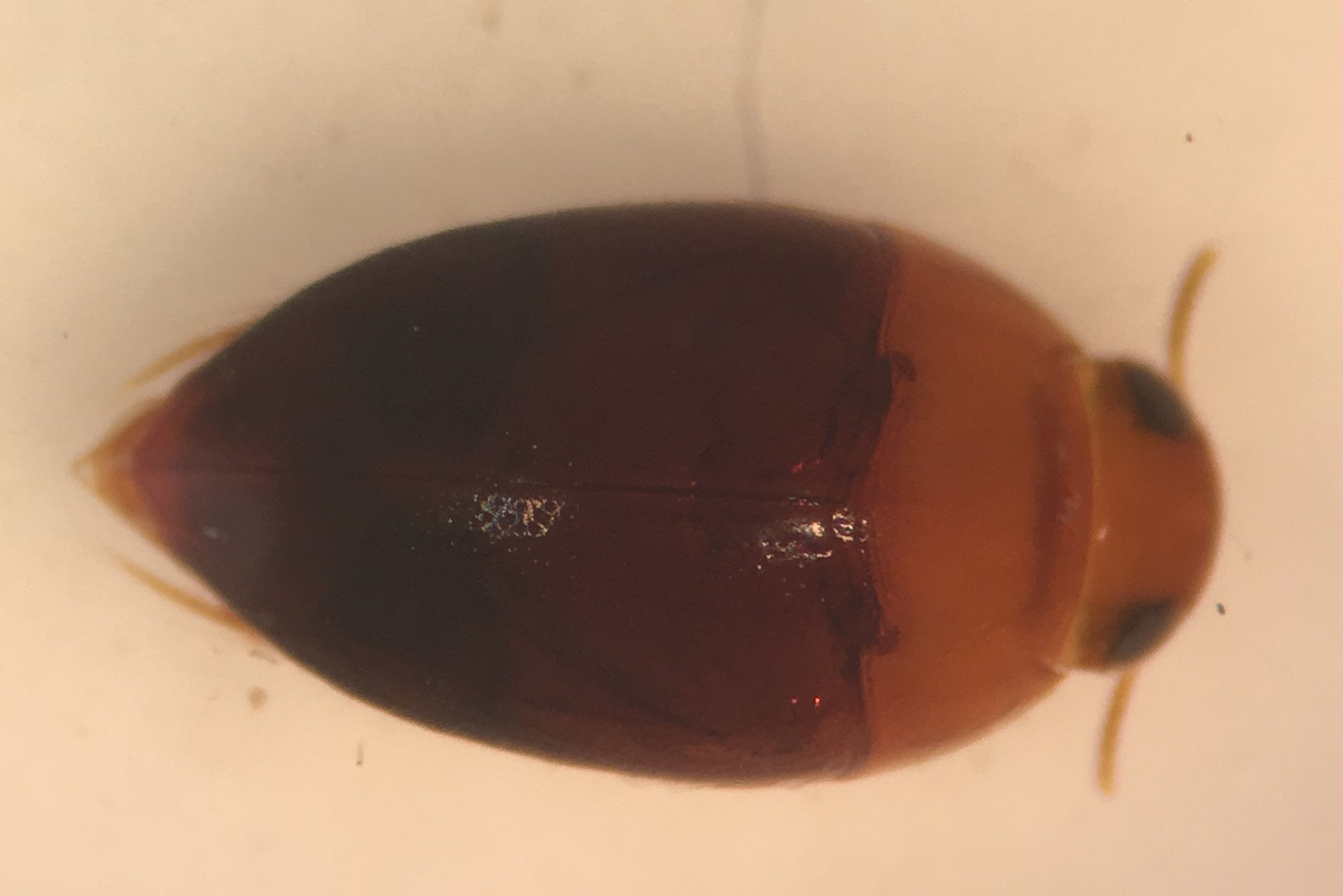
- Suphisellus bicolor

Scientific classification
- Kingdom: Animalia
- Phylum: Arthropoda
- Clade: Pancrustacea
- Class: Insecta
- Order: Coleoptera
- Suborder: Adephaga
- Family: Noteridae
- Subfamily: Noterinae
- Genus: Suphisellus; Crotch, 1873

Synonyms
- Pronoterus Sharp, 1882

= Suphisellus =

Genus of beetles

Suphisellus is a genus of beetles in the family Noteridae.

== Species ==
Suphisellus contains the following species:

- Suphisellus anticicollis Guignot, 1950:153
- Suphisellus balzani (Régimbart, 1889a:259) (Canthydrus balzani)
- Suphisellus bicolor (Say, 1830:33) (Noterus bicolor)
- Suphisellus binotatus (Fleutiaux & Sallé, 1890:370) (Canthydrus binotatus)
- Suphisellus brevicornis (Sharp, 1882a:273) (Canthydrus brevicornis)
- Suphisellus bruchi (Zimmermann, 1919:115) (Canthydrus bruchi)
- Suphisellus brunneus Guignot, 1950:152
- Suphisellus canthydroides Guignot, 1940:9
- Suphisellus cribrosus (Régimbart, 1903:59) (Canthydrus cribrosus)
- Suphisellus curtus (Sharp, 1882a:272) (Canthydrus curtus)
- Suphisellus dilutus (Sharp, 1882a:272) (Canthydrus dilutus)
- Suphisellus epleri Arce-Pérez & Baca, 2017:278
- Suphisellus flavolineatus (Régimbart, 1889a:262) (Canthydrus flavolineatus)
- Suphisellus flavopictus (Régimbart, 1889a:260) (Canthydrus flavopictus)
- Suphisellus gibbulus (Aubé, 1838:414) (Suphis gibbulus)
- Suphisellus globosus (Régimbart, 1903:62) (Canthydrus globosus)
- Suphisellus grammicus (Sharp, 1882a:274) (Canthydrus grammicus)
- Suphisellus grammopterus (Régimbart, 1889c:390) (Canthydrus grammopterus)
- Suphisellus grossus (Sharp, 1882a:270) (Canthydrus grossus)
- Suphisellus hieroglyphicus Zimmermann, 1921:187
- Suphisellus insularis (Sharp, 1882a:270) (Canthydrus insularis)
- Suphisellus levis (Fall, 1909:99) (Canthydrus levis)
- Suphisellus lineatus (Horn, 1871:329) (Suphis lineatus)
- Suphisellus majusculus (Sharp, 1882b:6) (Canthydrus majusculus)
- Suphisellus melzeri Zimmermann, 1925:254
- Suphisellus minimus Gschwendtner, 1922:135
- Suphisellus neglectus Young, 1979:419
- Suphisellus nigrinus (Aubé, 1838:411) (Hydrocanthus nigrinus)
- Suphisellus obesus (Régimbart, 1903:59) (Canthydrus obesus)
- Suphisellus obscuripennis (Régimbart, 1889a:257) (Canthydrus obscuripennis)
- Suphisellus ovatus (Sharp, 1882a:270) (Canthydrus ovatus)
- Suphisellus parsonsi Young, 1952:157
- Suphisellus penthimus Guignot, 1957:41
- Suphisellus pereirai Guignot, 1958:37
- Suphisellus phenax Guignot, 1954:198
- Suphisellus pinguiculus (Régimbart, 1903:62) (Canthydrus pinguiculus)
- Suphisellus puncticollis (Crotch, 1873:397) (Suphis puncticollis)
- Suphisellus remator (Sharp, 1882a: 272) (Canthydrus remator)
- Suphisellus rotundatus (Sharp, 1882a:270) (Canthydrus rotundatus)
- Suphisellus rubripes (Boheman, 1858:19) (Hydrocanthus rubripes)
- Suphisellus rufulus (Zimmermann, 1921:188)
- Suphisellus sculpturatus (Sharp, 1882a:269) (Canthydrus sculpturatus)
- Suphisellus semipunctatus (LeConte, 1878)
- Suphisellus sexnotatus (Régimbart, 1889a:259) (Canthydrus sexnotatus)
- Suphisellus similis Zimmermann, 1921:188
- Suphisellus simoni (Régimbart, 1889b:383) (Canthydrus simoni)
- Suphisellus subsignatus (Sharp, 1882a:271) (Canthydrus subsignatus)
- Suphisellus tenuicornis (Chevrolat, 1863:199) (Hydrocanthus tenuicornis)
- Suphisellus transversus (Régimbart, 1903:61) (Canthydrus transversus)
- Suphisellus vacuifer Guignot, 1958:37
- Suphisellus varians (Sharp, 1882b:5) (Canthydrus varians)
- Suphisellus variicollis Zimmermann, 1921:187
- Suphisellus vicinus (Sharp, 1882a:2699) (Canthydrus vicinus)
