= Renotus =

Renotus deyrollei

Scientific classification
- Kingdom: Animalia
- Phylum: Arthropoda
- Class: Insecta
- Order: Coleoptera
- Suborder: Adephaga
- Family: Noteridae
- Genus: Renotus; Guignot, 1936
- Species: R. deyrollei

Binomial name
- Renotus deyrollei (Sharp, 1882)

Genus of beetles

Renotus deyrollei is a species of beetle in the family Noteridae, the only species in the genus Renotus.
