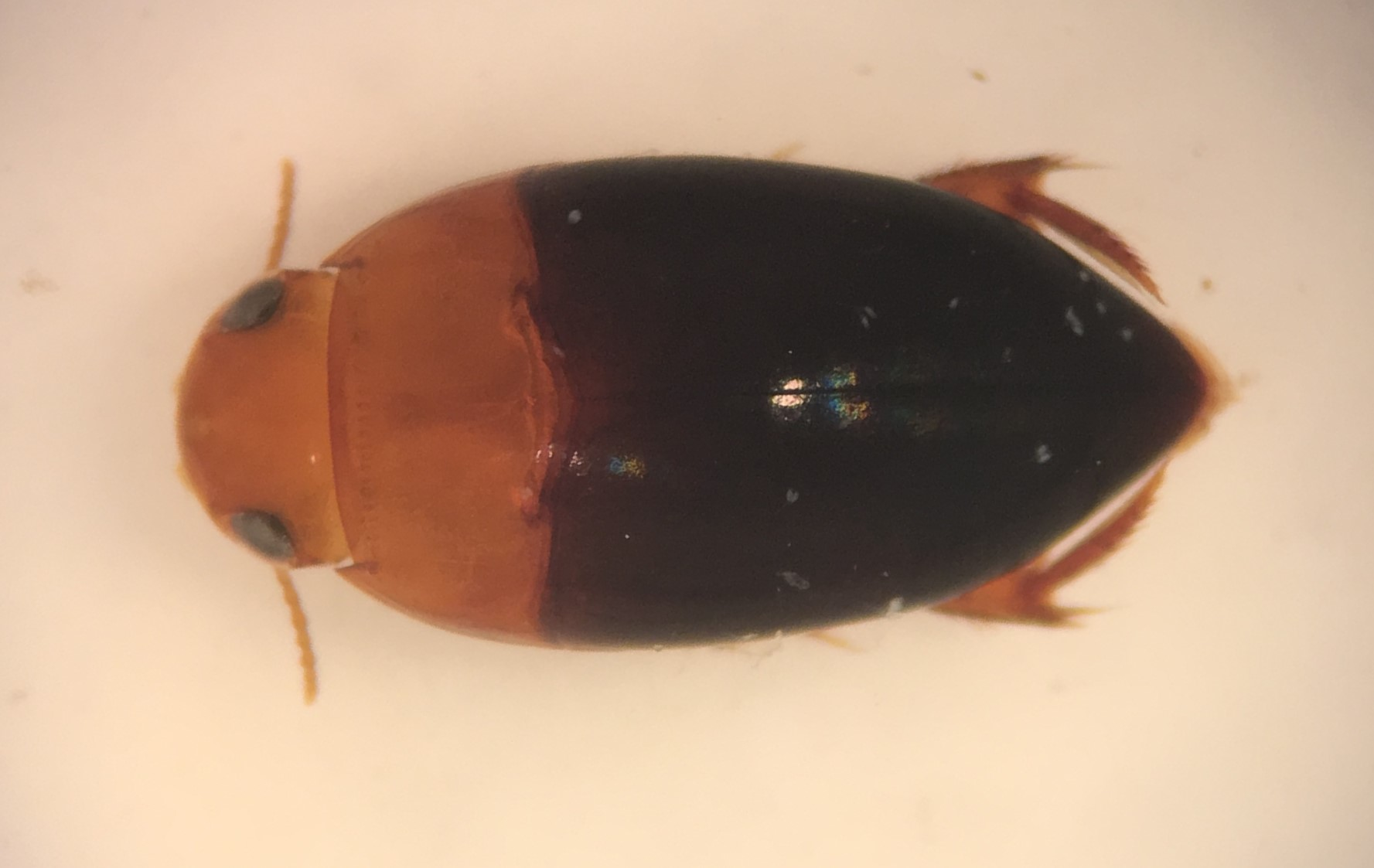
- Hydrocanthus atripennis

Scientific classification
- Kingdom: Animalia
- Phylum: Arthropoda
- Class: Insecta
- Order: Coleoptera
- Suborder: Adephaga
- Family: Noteridae
- Genus: Hydrocanthus; Say, 1823

= Hydrocanthus =

Genus of beetles

Hydrocanthus is a genus of beetles in the family Noteridae, containing the following species:

- ‡Hydrocanthus acrobeles Guignot, 1953
- ‡Hydrocanthus adrasus Guignot, 1950
- Hydrocanthus advena Sharp, 1882
- ‡Hydrocanthus alter Guignot, 1959
- Hydrocanthus ancus Guignot, 1942
- Hydrocanthus atripennis Say, 1830
- ‡Hydrocanthus australasiae Wehncke, 1876
- ‡Hydrocanthus balkei Toledo & Hendrich 2006
- ‡Hydrocanthus carbonarius Guignot, 1936 - This species was not included in Nilsson's revised catalogue of 2011.
- ‡Hydrocanthus colini Zimmermann, 1926
- ‡Hydrocanthus congoanus Gschwendtner, 1930
- ‡Hydrocanthus congrex Guignot, 1959
- ‡Hydrocanthus consimilis Gschwendtner, 1938
- ‡Hydrocanthus constrictus Régimbart, 1895
- Hydrocanthus debilis Sharp, 1882
- ‡Hydrocanthus delphinus Guignot, 1942
- ‡Hydrocanthus fabiennae Bameul, 1994
- Hydrocanthus fasciatus Steinheil, 1869
- ‡Hydrocanthus ferruginicollis Régimbart, 1895
- ‡Hydrocanthus funebris Fairmaire, 1869
- ‡Hydrocanthus gracilis H.J.Kolbe, 1883
- ‡Hydrocanthus grandis (Laporte, 1835)
- Hydrocanthus guignoti Young, 1985
- ‡Hydrocanthus impunctatus Gschwendtner, 1932
- ‡Hydrocanthus indicus Wehncke, 1876
- ‡Hydrocanthus insolitus Bilardo & Rocchi, 1987
- Hydrocanthus iricolor Say, 1823
- ‡Hydrocanthus klarae Gschwendtner, 1930
- ‡Hydrocanthus leleupi Guignot, 1955
- Hydrocanthus levigatus (Brullé, 1837)
- Hydrocanthus marmoratus Sharp, 1882
- ‡Hydrocanthus micans Wehncke, 1883
- ‡Hydrocanthus mocquerysi Régimbart, 1895
- Hydrocanthus oblongus Sharp, 1882
- Hydrocanthus occidentalis Young, 1985
- Hydrocanthus pallisteri Young, 1985
- ‡Hydrocanthus paludicola Guignot, 1951
- Hydrocanthus paludimonstrus K.B.Miller, 2001
- Hydrocanthus paraguayensis Zimmermann, 1928
- ‡Hydrocanthus parvulus Gschwendtner, 1930
- ‡Hydrocanthus pederzanii Toledo & Hendrich, 2006
- ‡Hydrocanthus prolixus Sharp, 1904
- Hydrocanthus regius Young, 1953
- Hydrocanthus rubiginosus Guignot, 1942
- ‡Hydrocanthus secutor Guignot, 1955
- Hydrocanthus sharpi Zimmermann, 1928
- ‡Hydrocanthus sicarius Guignot, 1947
- Hydrocanthus socius R.F.Sahlberg, 1844
- ‡Hydrocanthus subplanatus Gschwendtner, 1933
- ‡Hydrocanthus upembicus Guignot, 1954
- ‡Hydrocanthus vadoni Guignot, 1936
- ‡Hydrocanthus waterhousei Blackburn, 1888
- ‡Hydrocanthus wittei Gschwendtner, 1930

In 2016, Baca et al. split this genus into two, reviving the subgeneric name Sternocanthus Guignot, 1948 and elevating it to the rank of genus. The species which were transferred to that genus are indicated with the symbol ‡.
