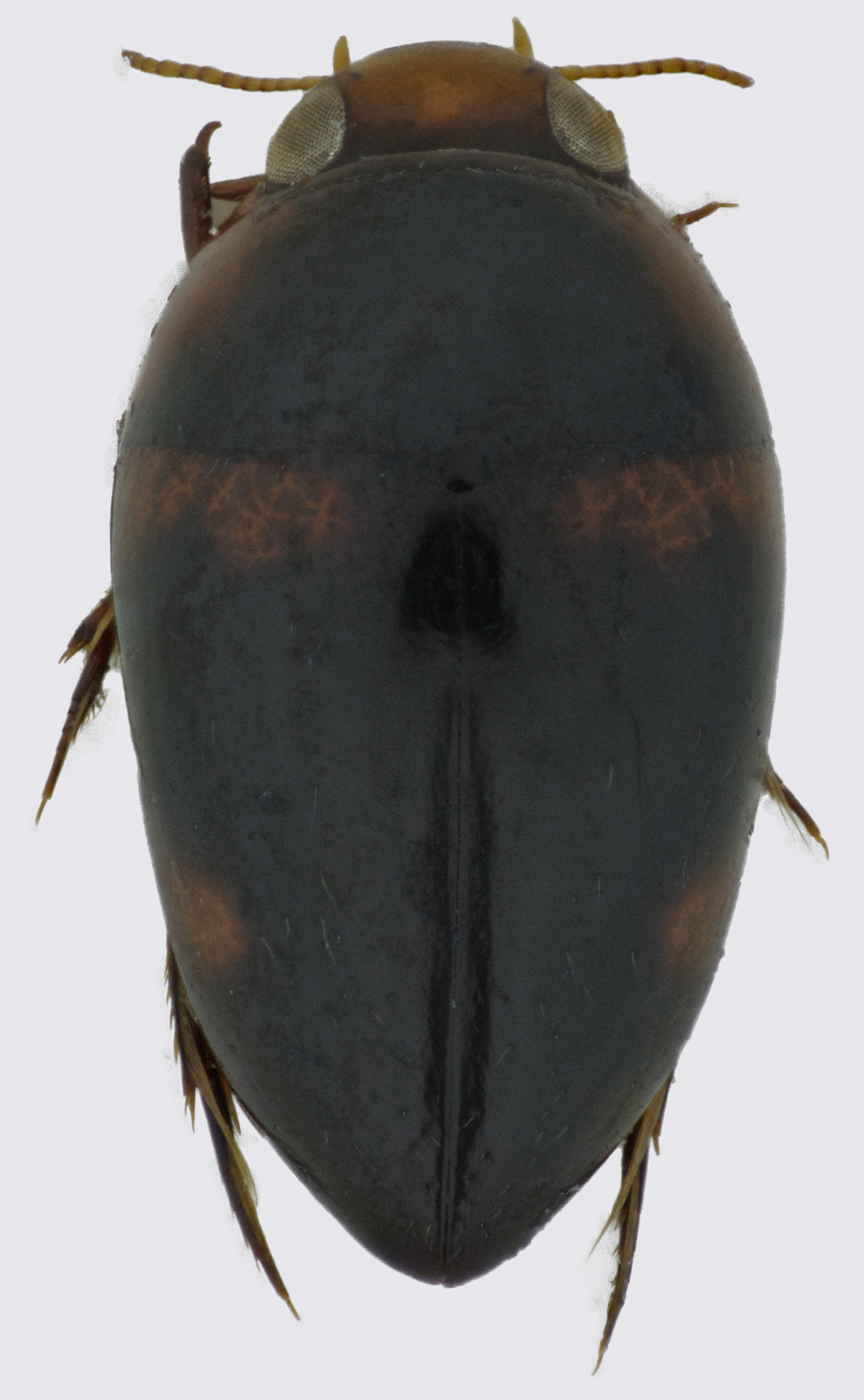

Scientific classification
- Kingdom: Animalia
- Phylum: Arthropoda
- Class: Insecta
- Order: Coleoptera
- Suborder: Adephaga
- Family: Noteridae
- Genus: Canthydrus; Sharp, 1882

= Canthydrus =

Genus of beetles

Canthydrus is a genus of beetles in the family Noteridae, containing the following species:

- Canthydrus alluaudi Régimbart, 1906
- Canthydrus andobonensis Guignot, 1960
- Canthydrus angustus Guignot, 1957
- Canthydrus antonellae Toledo, 2003
- Canthydrus apicicornis Régimbart, 1895
- Canthydrus arabicus Sharp, 1882
- Canthydrus bakeri Peschet, 1921
- Canthydrus bellus Régimbart, 1895
- Canthydrus birmanicus Guignot, 1956
- Canthydrus bisignatus Wehncke, 1883
- Canthydrus blanditus Guignot, 1959
- Canthydrus bovillae Blackburn, 1890
- Canthydrus buqueti (Laporte, 1835)
- Canthydrus concolor Sharp, 1882
- Canthydrus diophthalmus (Reiche & Saulcy, 1855)
- Canthydrus edanus Guignot, 1953
- Canthydrus ephemeralis Watts, 2001
- Canthydrus festivus Régimbart, 1888
- Canthydrus flammulatus Sharp, 1882
- Canthydrus flavomaculatus Gschwendtner, 1930
- Canthydrus flavosignatus Régimbart, 1903
- Canthydrus flavus (Motschulsky, 1855)
- Canthydrus gibberosus Guignot, 1951
- Canthydrus gracilis Bilardo & Rocchi, 1990
- Canthydrus guttula (Aubé, 1838)
- Canthydrus haagi (Wehncke, 1876)
- Canthydrus imitator Guignot, 1942
- Canthydrus irenicus Guignot, 1955
- Canthydrus koppi Wehncke, 1883
- Canthydrus laccophiloides Gschwendtner, 1930
- Canthydrus laetabilis (Walker, 1858)
- Canthydrus luctuosus (Aubé, 1838)
- Canthydrus maculatus Wehncke, 1883
- Canthydrus minutus Régimbart, 1895
- Canthydrus moneres Guignot, 1955
- Canthydrus morsbachi (Wehncke, 1876)
- Canthydrus morulus Omer-Cooper, 1931
- Canthydrus natalensis J.Balfour-Browne, 1939
- Canthydrus nigerrimus Omer-Cooper, 1957
- Canthydrus nitidulus Sharp, 1882
- Canthydrus notula (Erichson, 1843)
- Canthydrus octoguttatus Zimmermann, 1921
- Canthydrus politus (Sharp, 1873)
- Canthydrus procurvus Guignot, 1942
- Canthydrus proximus Sharp, 1882
- Canthydrus pseudomorsbachi Vazirani, 1969
- Canthydrus quadriguttatus Guignot, 1955
- Canthydrus quadrivittatus (Boheman, 1848)
- Canthydrus rasilis Guignot, 1942
- Canthydrus ritsemae (Régimbart, 1880)
- Canthydrus rocchii Wewalka, 1992
- Canthydrus rossanae Bilardo & Rocchi, 1987
- Canthydrus rubropictus Régimbart, 1895
- Canthydrus ruficollis Régimbart, 1895
- Canthydrus sedilloti Régimbart, 1895
- Canthydrus semperi (Wehncke, 1876)
- Canthydrus sepulcralis Guignot, 1956
- Canthydrus serialis Fauvel, 1883
- Canthydrus testaceus (Boheman, 1858)
- Canthydrus ugandae J.Balfour-Browne, 1939
- Canthydrus uniformis Zimmermann, 1921
- Canthydrus verbekei Guignot, 1959
- Canthydrus weisei (Wehncke, 1876)
- Canthydrus xanthinus Régimbart, 1895
