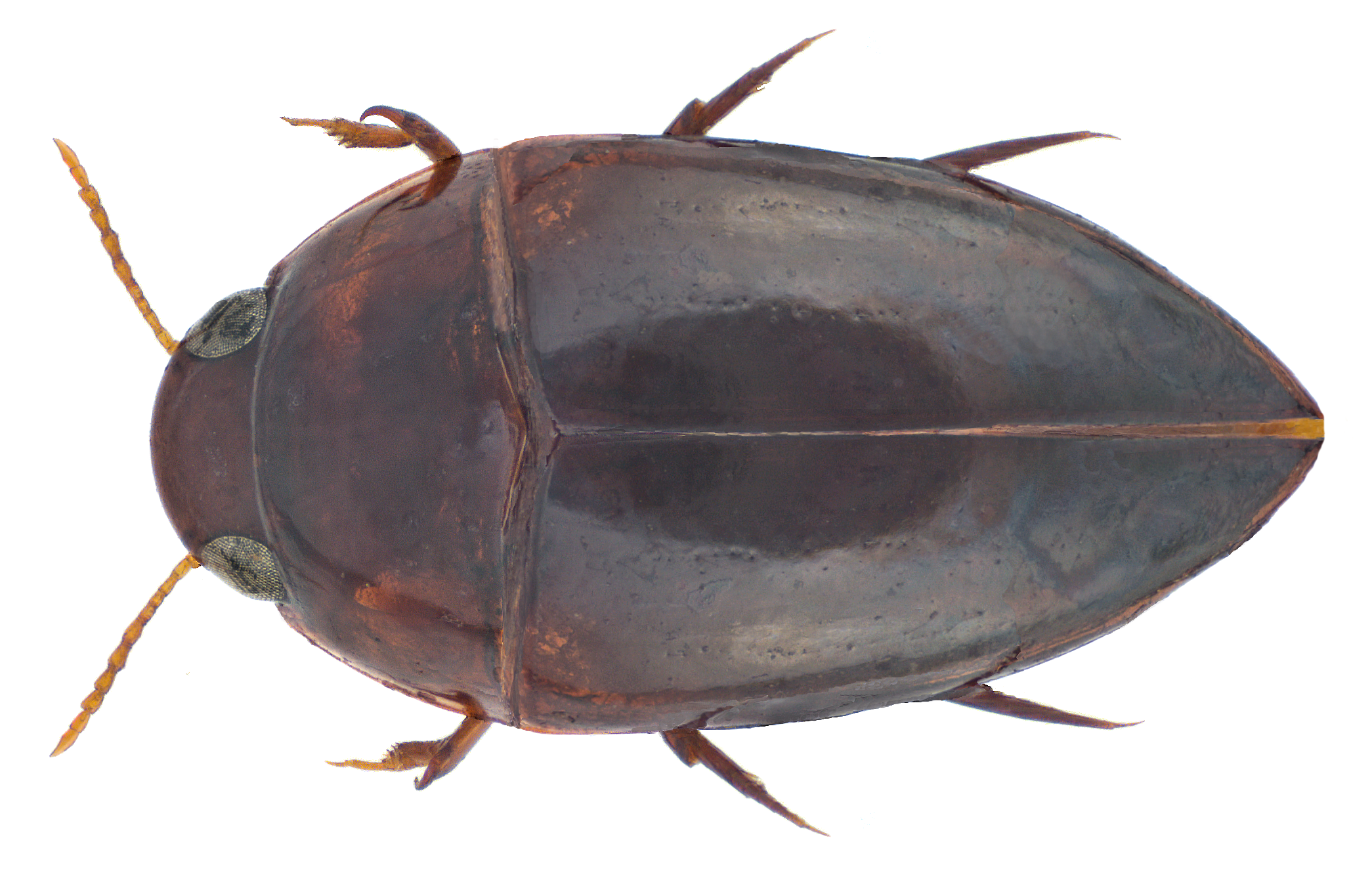
- Hydrocanthus micans

Scientific classification
- Kingdom: Animalia
- Phylum: Arthropoda
- Clade: Pancrustacea
- Class: Insecta
- Order: Coleoptera
- Suborder: Adephaga
- Family: Noteridae; C. G. Thomson, 1860

= Noteridae =

Family of beetles

Noteridae is a family of adephagan water beetles closely related to the Dytiscidae, and formerly classified with them. They are mainly distinguished by the presence of a distinctive "noterid platform" underneath, in the form of a plate between the second and third pair of legs. The family is found worldwide, more commonly in the tropics. They are sometimes referred to as burrowing water beetles.

These beetles are relatively small, ranging from 1 to 6 mm, with smooth oval bodies ranging from light brown to a darker reddish brown. The head is short and somewhat covered by the prothorax.

Both adults and larvae are aquatic, and are commonly found around plants. They have a habit of burrowing through pond and marsh substrate, thus the common name, and are primarily carnivorous, with some scavenging observed.

== Genera ==
There are two subfamilies with in total three tribes and 24 genera:

Subfamily Noterinae C. G. Thomson, 1860

Tribe Noterini C. G. Thomson, 1860

- Aponwaopterus García and Jiménez-Ramos, 2019
- Bicarinaus García, 2018
- Canthydrus Sharp, 1882
- Canthysellus Baca and Toledo, 2015
- Hydrocanthus Say, 1823
- Jolyssellus García and Jiménez-Ramos, 2019
- Liocanthydrus Guignot, 1957
- Llanoterus García and Camacho, 2018
- Mesonoterus Sharp, 1882
- Neohydrocoptus Sato, 1972
- Noterus Clairville, 1806
- Polylobata García, 2019
- Prionohydrus Gómez and Miller, 2013
- Renotus Guignot, 1936
- Shepardhydras García, 2018
- Sternocanthus Guignot, 1948
- Suphis Aubé, 1836
- Suphisellus Crotch, 1873
- Suretonorpus García, 2022
- Synchortus Sharp, 1880
- Tonerus Miller, 2009

Subfamily Notomicrinae Zimmermann, 1919

Tribe Notomicrini Sharp, 1882

- Notomicrus Sharp, 1882
- Speonoterus Spangler, 1996

Tribe Phreatodytini Uéno, 1957

- Phreatodytes Uéno, 1957
