= C. nitidus =

C. nitidus may refer to:

- Calymmaderus nitidus, a beetle species
- Carpodectes nitidus, the snowy cotinga, a bird species found in Costa Rica, Honduras, Nicaragua and Panama
- Cimolodon nitidus, a mammal species from the Upper Cretaceous of North America
- Copelatus nitidus, a diving beetle species
- Ctenopharynx nitidus, a fish species found in Malawi, Mozambique and Tanzania

== See also ==
- Nitidus (disambiguation)
