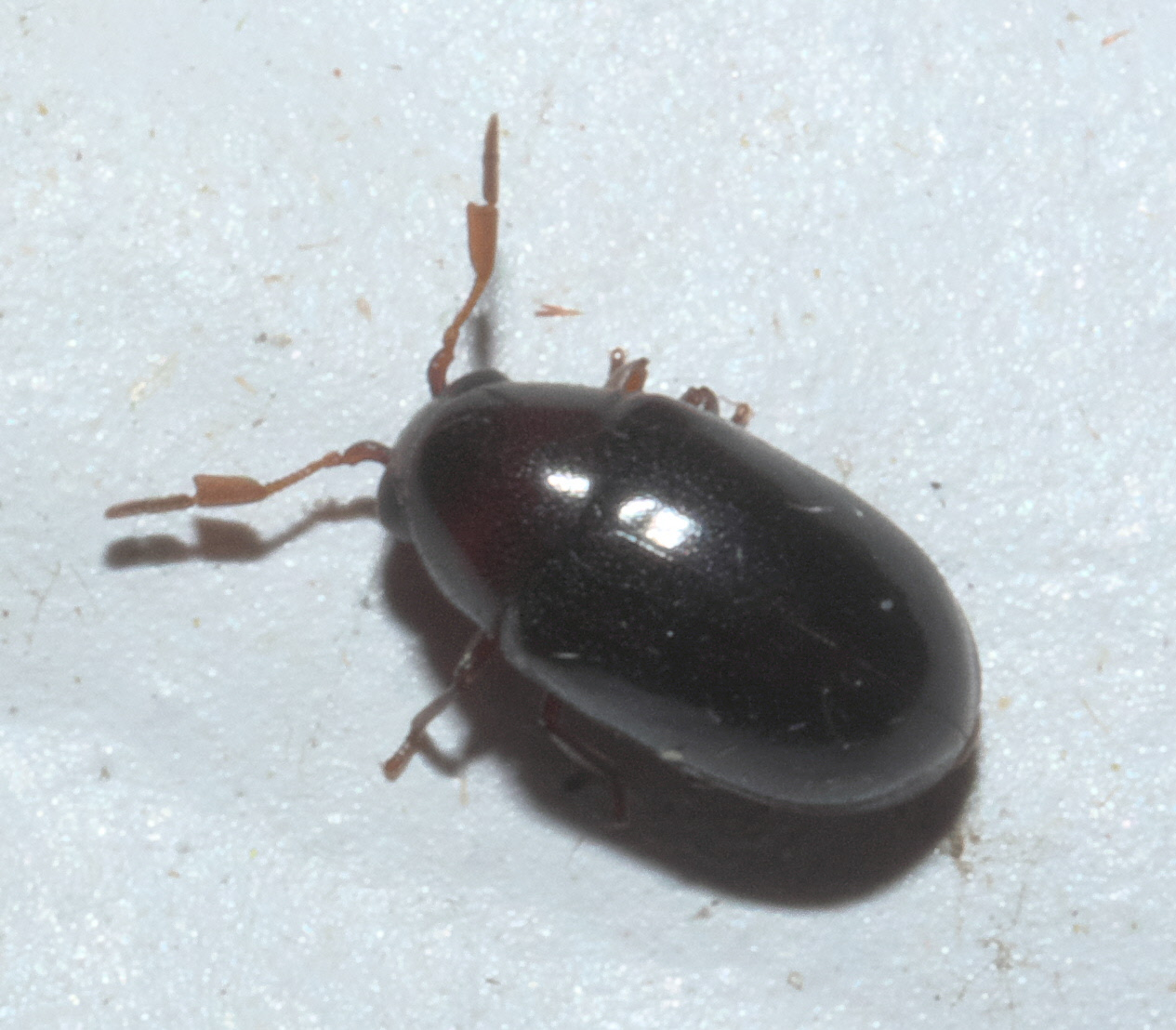
- Calymmaderus nitidus

Scientific classification
- Kingdom: Animalia
- Phylum: Arthropoda
- Clade: Pancrustacea
- Class: Insecta
- Order: Coleoptera
- Suborder: Polyphaga
- Superfamily: Bostrichoidea
- Family: Ptinidae
- Subfamily: Dorcatominae
- Tribe: Calymmaderini
- Genus: Calymmaderus; Solier, 1849

Synonyms
- Byrrhocerus LeConte, 1861; Eupactus Kiesenwetter, 1877; Eutheca Gorham, 1883; Lioolius Gorham, 1883; Nevermannia Brethes, 1919; Nevermannus Fisher, 1927; Thaptor Fisher, 1927

= Calymmaderus =

Genus of beetles

Calymmaderus is a genus of beetles in the family Ptinidae. There are about 11 described species in Calymmaderus.

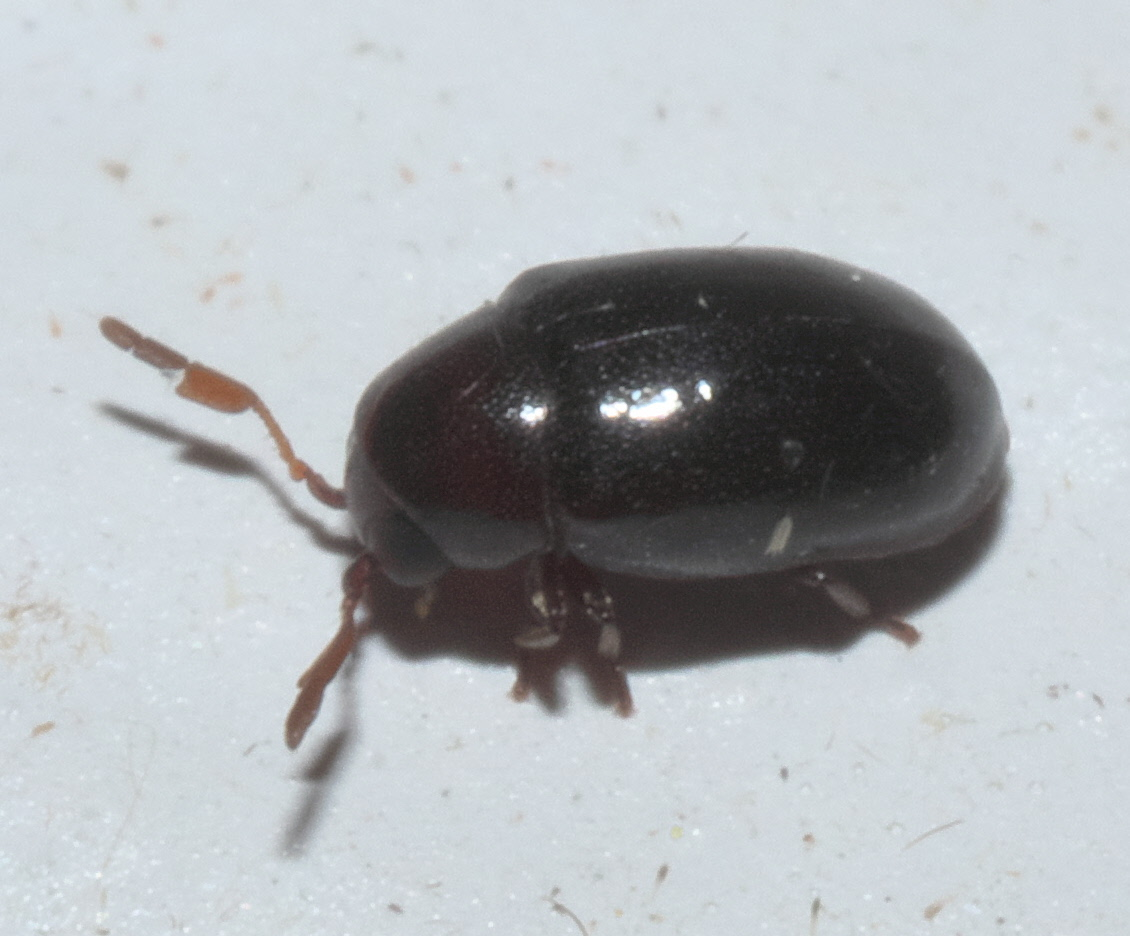
Calymmaderus nitidus

== Species ==
These 11 species belong to the genus Calymmaderus:

- Calymmaderus advenus (Fall, 1905)^{i c g}
- Calymmaderus amoenus (Fall, 1905)^{i c g}
- Calymmaderus bibliothecarum (Poey, 1851)^{g}
- Calymmaderus brevissimus (Pic, 1909)^{g}
- Calymmaderus nitidus (LeConte, 1865)^{i c g b}
- Calymmaderus oblongus (Gorham, 1883)^{g}
- Calymmaderus obsoletus (Fall, 1905)^{i c g b}
- Calymmaderus pudicus (Boheman, 1858)^{i c g}
- Calymmaderus punctulatus (LeConte, 1865)^{i c g b}
- Calymmaderus similis (Fall, 1905)^{i c g}
- Calymmaderus solidus (Kiesenwetter, 1877)^{g}

Data sources: i = ITIS, c = Catalogue of Life, g = GBIF, b = Bugguide.net
