= Calymmaderus punctulatus =

Scientific classification
- Kingdom: Animalia
- Phylum: Arthropoda
- Class: Insecta
- Order: Coleoptera
- Suborder: Polyphaga
- Family: Ptinidae
- Genus: Calymmaderus
- Species: C. punctulatus

Binomial name
- Calymmaderus punctulatus (LeConte, 1865)

Synonyms
- Calymmaderus viticolus Schwarz, 1878

Species of beetle

Calymmaderus punctulatus is a species of beetle in the family Ptinidae.
