= Calymmaderus pudicus =

Scientific classification
- Kingdom: Animalia
- Phylum: Arthropoda
- Class: Insecta
- Order: Coleoptera
- Suborder: Polyphaga
- Family: Ptinidae
- Genus: Calymmaderus
- Species: C. pudicus

Binomial name
- Calymmaderus pudicus (Boheman, 1858)

Species of beetle

Calymmaderus pudicus is a species of beetle in the family Ptinidae.
