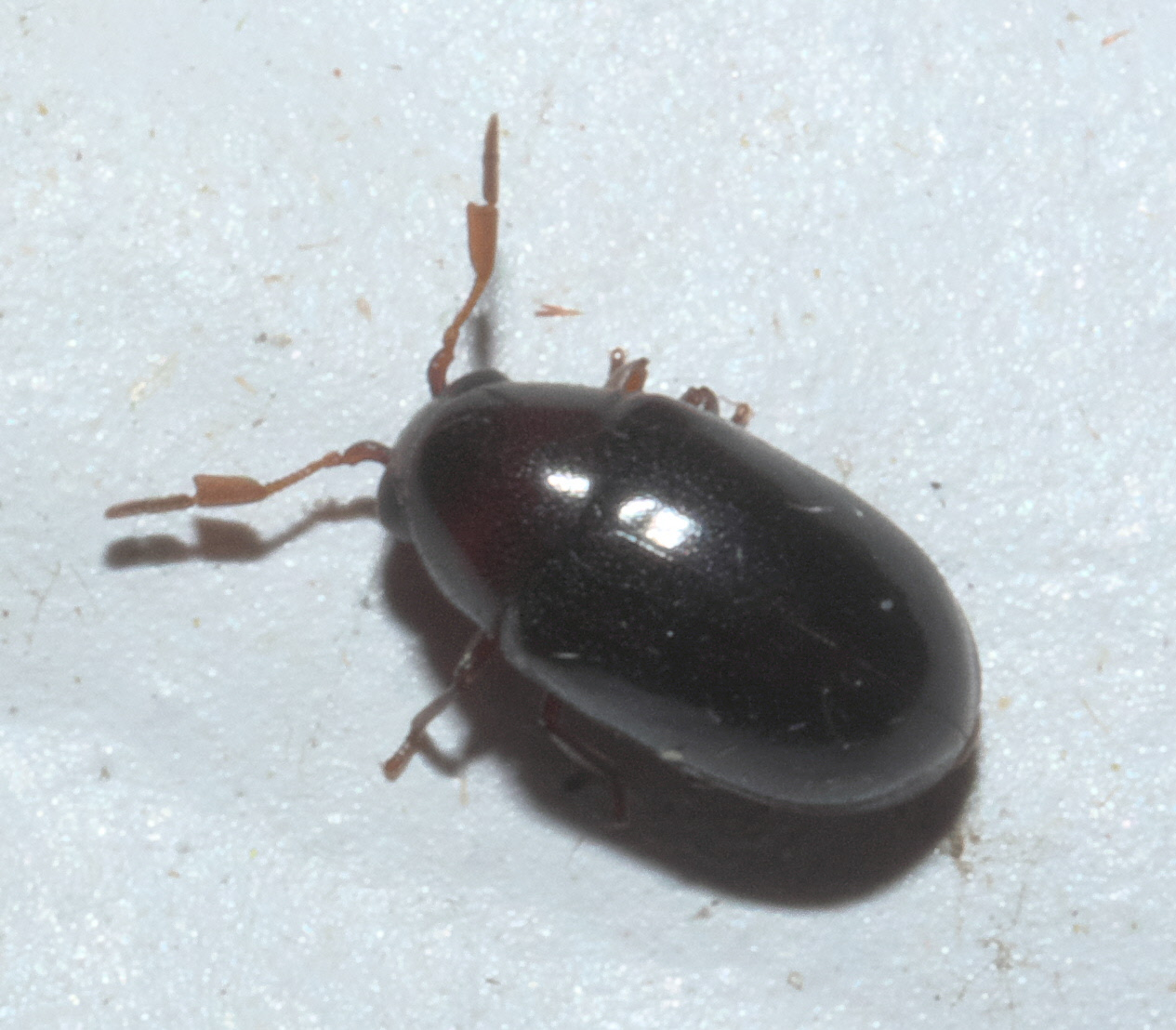

Scientific classification
- Kingdom: Animalia
- Phylum: Arthropoda
- Class: Insecta
- Order: Coleoptera
- Suborder: Polyphaga
- Family: Ptinidae
- Genus: Calymmaderus
- Species: C. nitidus

Binomial name
- Calymmaderus nitidus (LeConte, 1865)

= Calymmaderus nitidus =

Species of beetle

Calymmaderus nitidus is a species of beetle in the family Ptinidae.

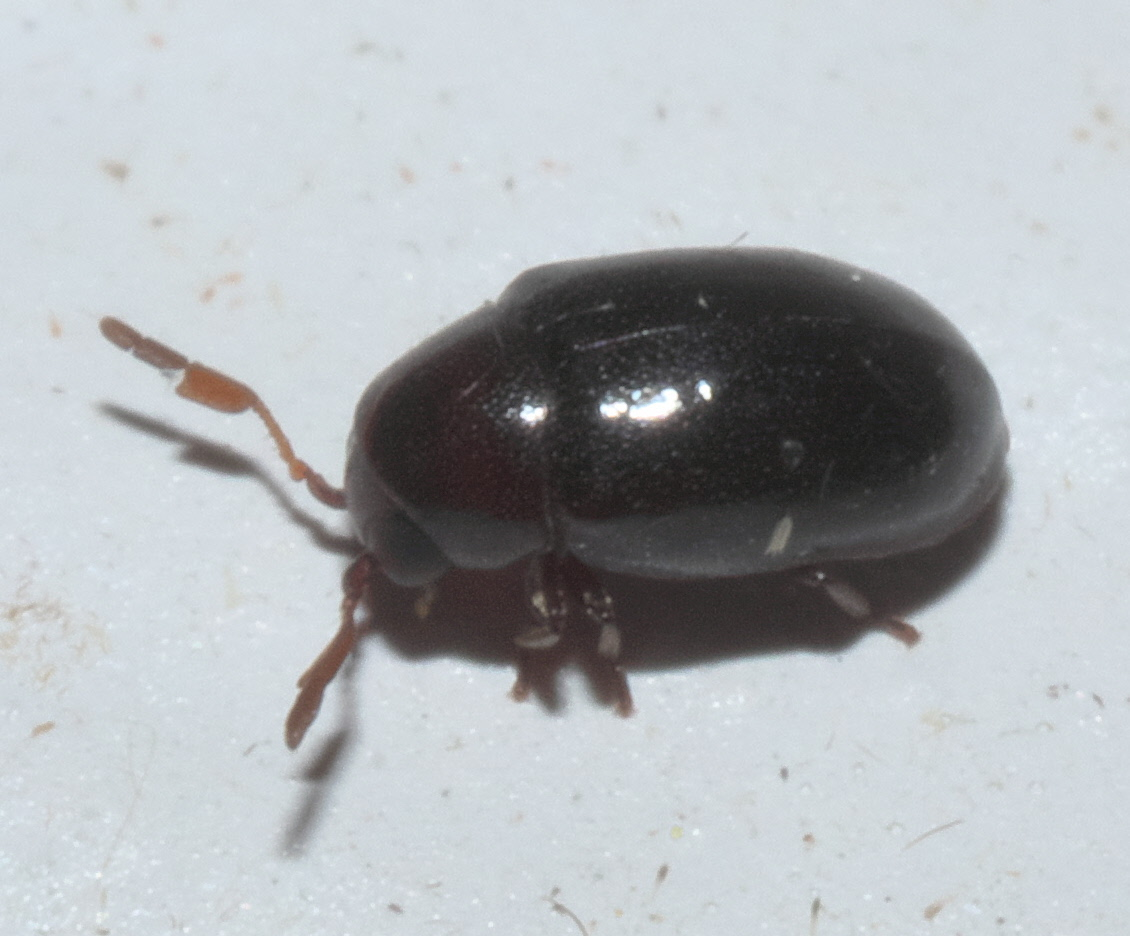
