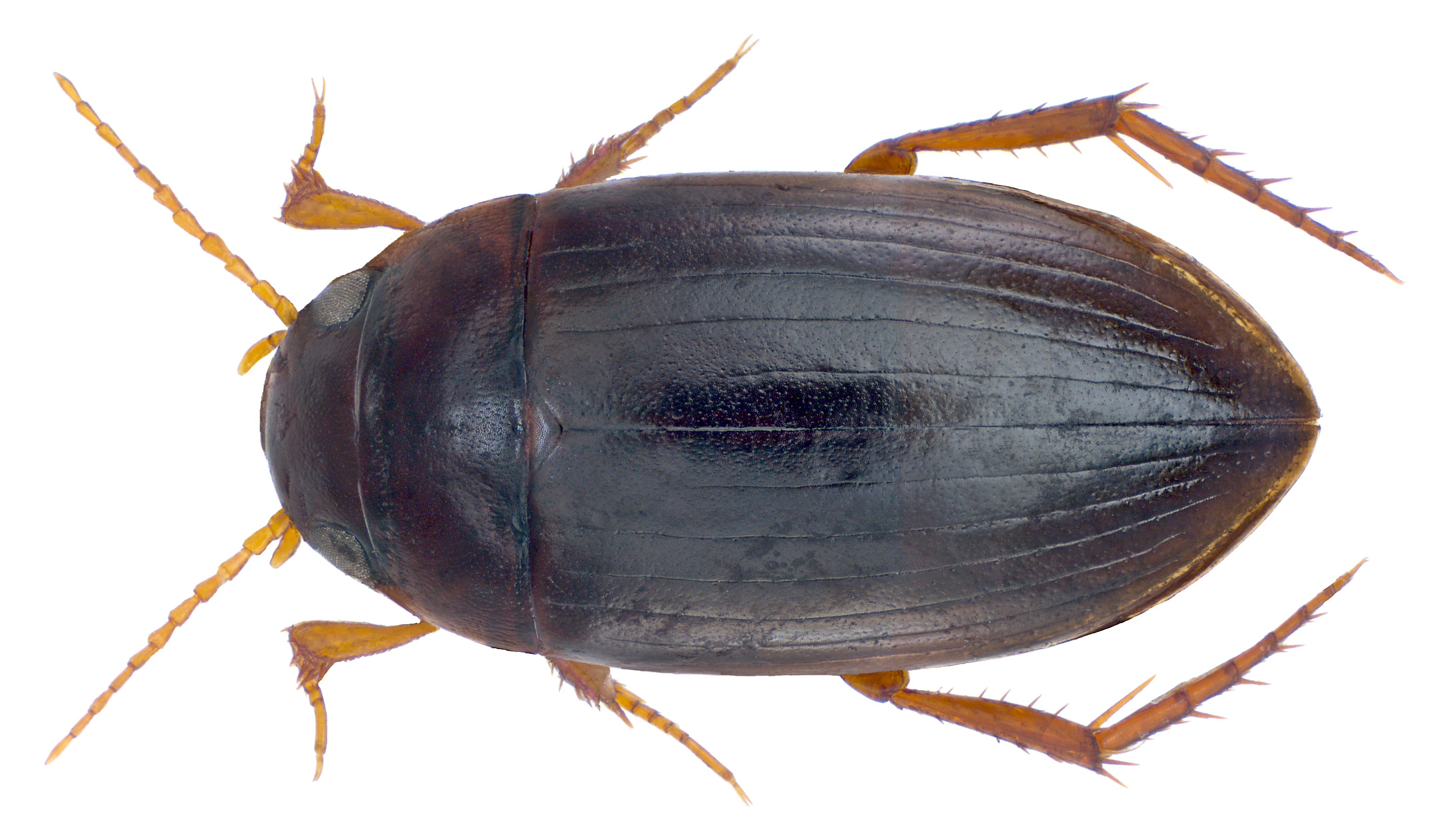

Scientific classification
- Domain: Eukaryota
- Kingdom: Animalia
- Phylum: Arthropoda
- Class: Insecta
- Order: Coleoptera
- Suborder: Adephaga
- Family: Dytiscidae
- Genus: Copelatus
- Species: C. tenebrosus

Binomial name
- Copelatus tenebrosus Régimbart, 1880

Synonyms
- Copelatus assamensis Vazirani, 1970; Copelatus ceylonicus Vazirani, 1969

= Copelatus tenebrosus =

Species of beetle

Copelatus tenebrosus is a species of diving beetle. It is part of the genus Copelatus in the subfamily Copelatinae of the family Dytiscidae. It was described by Régimbart in 1880.
