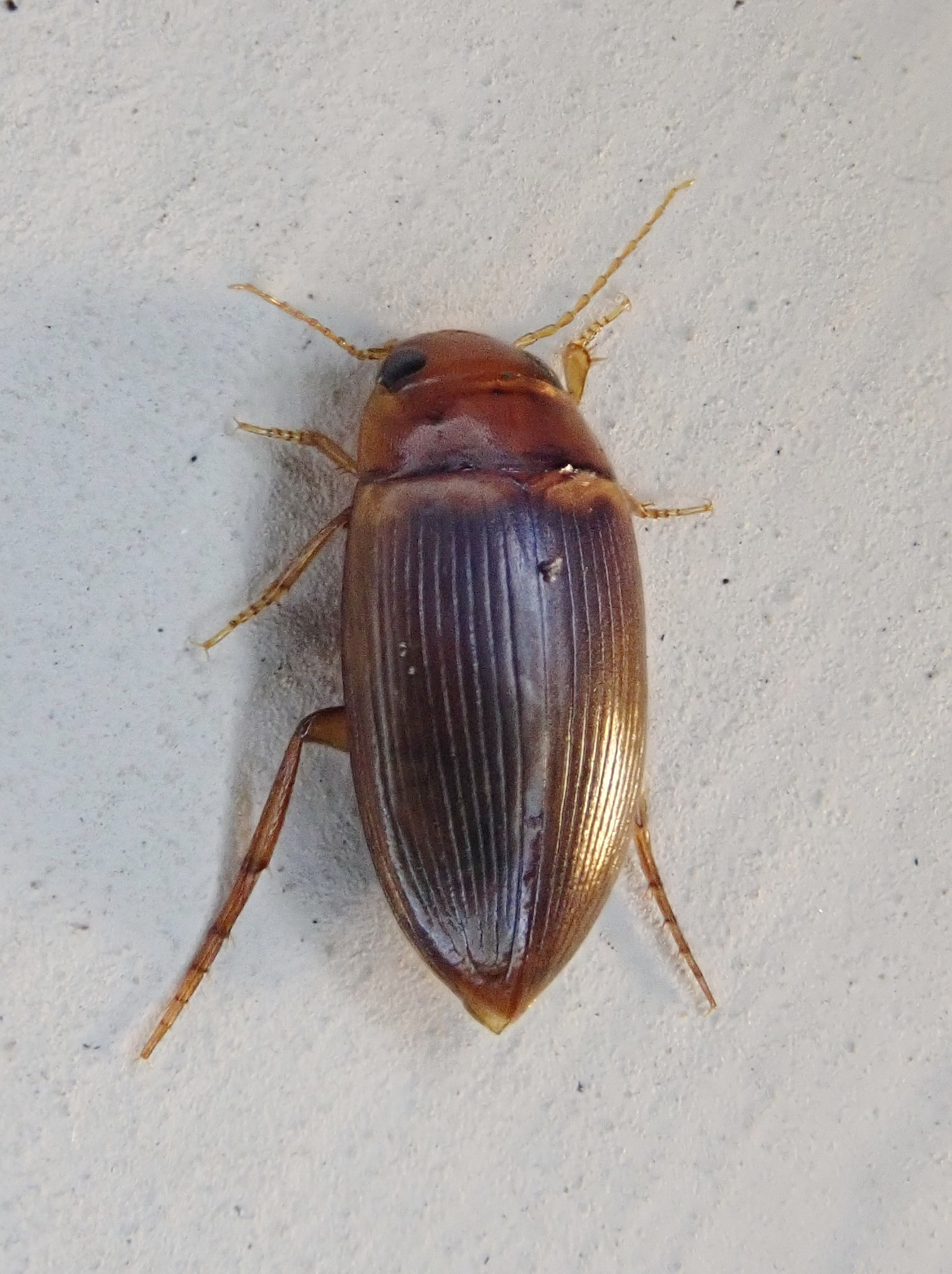

Scientific classification
- Domain: Eukaryota
- Kingdom: Animalia
- Phylum: Arthropoda
- Class: Insecta
- Order: Coleoptera
- Suborder: Adephaga
- Family: Dytiscidae
- Genus: Copelatus
- Species: C. caelatipennis

Binomial name
- Copelatus caelatipennis Aubé, 1838

= Copelatus caelatipennis =

Species of beetle

Copelatus caelatipennis is a species of diving beetle. It is part of the genus Copelatus in the subfamily Copelatinae of the family Dytiscidae. It was described by Aubé in 1838.
