= Copelatus taprobanicus =

Scientific classification
- Domain: Eukaryota
- Kingdom: Animalia
- Phylum: Arthropoda
- Class: Insecta
- Order: Coleoptera
- Suborder: Adephaga
- Family: Dytiscidae
- Genus: Copelatus
- Species: C. taprobanicus

Binomial name
- Copelatus taprobanicus Wewalka & Vazirani, 1985

Species of beetle

Copelatus taprobanicus is a species of diving beetle endemic to Sri Lanka. It is part of the genus Copelatus in the subfamily Copelatinae of the family Dytiscidae. It was described by Wewalka & Vazirani in 1985.
