= Copelatus mvoungensis =

Scientific classification
- Domain: Eukaryota
- Kingdom: Animalia
- Phylum: Arthropoda
- Class: Insecta
- Order: Coleoptera
- Suborder: Adephaga
- Family: Dytiscidae
- Genus: Copelatus
- Species: C. mvoungensis

Binomial name
- Copelatus mvoungensis Bilardo & Rocchi, 2004

Species of beetle

Copelatus mvoungensis is a species of diving beetle. It is part of the genus Copelatus, which is in the subfamily Copelatinae of the family Dytiscidae. It was described by Bilardo & Rocchi in 2004.
