= Copelatus basilewskyi =

Scientific classification
- Domain: Eukaryota
- Kingdom: Animalia
- Phylum: Arthropoda
- Class: Insecta
- Order: Coleoptera
- Suborder: Adephaga
- Family: Dytiscidae
- Genus: Copelatus
- Species: C. basilewskyi

Binomial name
- Copelatus basilewskyi Bilardo & Pederzani, 1979

Species of beetle

Copelatus basilewskyi is a species of diving beetle. It is part of the genus Copelatus in the subfamily Copelatinae of the family Dytiscidae. It was described by Bilardo & Pederzani in 1979.
