= Copelatus iguelaensis =

Scientific classification
- Domain: Eukaryota
- Kingdom: Animalia
- Phylum: Arthropoda
- Class: Insecta
- Order: Coleoptera
- Suborder: Adephaga
- Family: Dytiscidae
- Genus: Copelatus
- Species: C. iguelaensis

Binomial name
- Copelatus iguelaensis Bilardo & Rocchi, 2002

Species of beetle

Copelatus iguelaensis is a species of diving beetle. It is part of the genus Copelatus of the subfamily Copelatinae in the family Dytiscidae. It was described by Bilardo & Rocchi in 2002.
