= Copelatus ogasawarensis =

Scientific classification
- Domain: Eukaryota
- Kingdom: Animalia
- Phylum: Arthropoda
- Class: Insecta
- Order: Coleoptera
- Suborder: Adephaga
- Family: Dytiscidae
- Genus: Copelatus
- Species: C. ogasawarensis

Binomial name
- Copelatus ogasawarensis Kamiya, 1932

Species of beetle

Copelatus ogasawarensis is a species of diving beetle. It is part of the genus Copelatus in the subfamily Copelatinae of the family Dytiscidae. It was described by Kamiya in 1932.
