= Copelatus ibrahimi =

Scientific classification
- Kingdom: Animalia
- Phylum: Arthropoda
- Class: Insecta
- Order: Coleoptera
- Suborder: Adephaga
- Family: Dytiscidae
- Genus: Copelatus
- Species: C. ibrahimi

Binomial name
- Copelatus ibrahimi Angus & Kaschef, 2000

Species of beetle

Copelatus ibrahimi is a species of diving beetle. It is part of the genus Copelatus in the subfamily Copelatinae of the family Dytiscidae. It was described by Angus & Kaschef in 2000.
