= Copelatus senegalensis =

Scientific classification
- Domain: Eukaryota
- Kingdom: Animalia
- Phylum: Arthropoda
- Class: Insecta
- Order: Coleoptera
- Suborder: Adephaga
- Family: Dytiscidae
- Genus: Copelatus
- Species: C. senegalensis

Binomial name
- Copelatus senegalensis Lagar & Herondo, 1991

Species of beetle

Copelatus senegalensis is a species of diving beetle. It is part of the subfamily Copelatinae in the family Dytiscidae. It was described by Lagar & Herondo in 1991.
