= Copelatus angolensis =

Scientific classification
- Domain: Eukaryota
- Kingdom: Animalia
- Phylum: Arthropoda
- Class: Insecta
- Order: Coleoptera
- Suborder: Adephaga
- Family: Dytiscidae
- Genus: Copelatus
- Species: C. angolensis

Binomial name
- Copelatus angolensis Peschet, 1924

Species of beetle

Copelatus angolensis is a species of diving beetle. It is part of the genus Copelatus of the subfamily Copelatinae in the family Dytiscidae. It was described by Peschet in 1924.
