= Copelatus uludanuensis =

Scientific classification
- Kingdom: Animalia
- Phylum: Arthropoda
- Class: Insecta
- Order: Coleoptera
- Suborder: Adephaga
- Family: Dytiscidae
- Genus: Copelatus
- Species: C. uludanuensis

Binomial name
- Copelatus uludanuensis Hendrich & Balke, 1995

Species of beetle

Copelatus uludanuensis is a species of diving beetle. It is part of the subfamily Copelatinae in the family Dytiscidae. It was described by Hendrich & Balke in 1995.
