= Copelatus normalis =

Scientific classification
- Kingdom: Animalia
- Phylum: Arthropoda
- Class: Insecta
- Order: Coleoptera
- Suborder: Adephaga
- Family: Dytiscidae
- Genus: Copelatus
- Species: C. normalis

Binomial name
- Copelatus normalis Erichson, 1847

Species of beetle

Copelatus normalis is a species of diving beetle. It is part of the genus Copelatus in the subfamily Copelatinae of the family Dytiscidae. It was described by Wilhelm Ferdinand Erichson in 1847.
