= Copelatus vigintistriatus =

Scientific classification
- Kingdom: Animalia
- Phylum: Arthropoda
- Class: Insecta
- Order: Coleoptera
- Suborder: Adephaga
- Family: Dytiscidae
- Genus: Copelatus
- Species: C. vigintistriatus

Binomial name
- Copelatus vigintistriatus Fairmaire, 1869

Species of beetle

Copelatus vigintistriatus is a species of diving beetle. It is part of the subfamily Copelatinae in the family Dytiscidae. It was described by Fairmaire in 1869.
