= Copelatus ilybioides =

Scientific classification
- Domain: Eukaryota
- Kingdom: Animalia
- Phylum: Arthropoda
- Class: Insecta
- Order: Coleoptera
- Suborder: Adephaga
- Family: Dytiscidae
- Genus: Copelatus
- Species: C. ilybioides

Binomial name
- Copelatus ilybioides Régimbart, 1895

Species of beetle

Copelatus ilybioides is a species of predaceous diving beetle in the family Dytiscidae. It is found in Africa.
