= Copelatus validus =

Scientific classification
- Kingdom: Animalia
- Phylum: Arthropoda
- Class: Insecta
- Order: Coleoptera
- Suborder: Adephaga
- Family: Dytiscidae
- Genus: Copelatus
- Species: C. validus

Binomial name
- Copelatus validus Sharp, 1882

Species of beetle

Copelatus validus is a species of diving beetle. It is part of the subfamily Copelatinae in the family Dytiscidae. It was described by Sharp in 1882.
