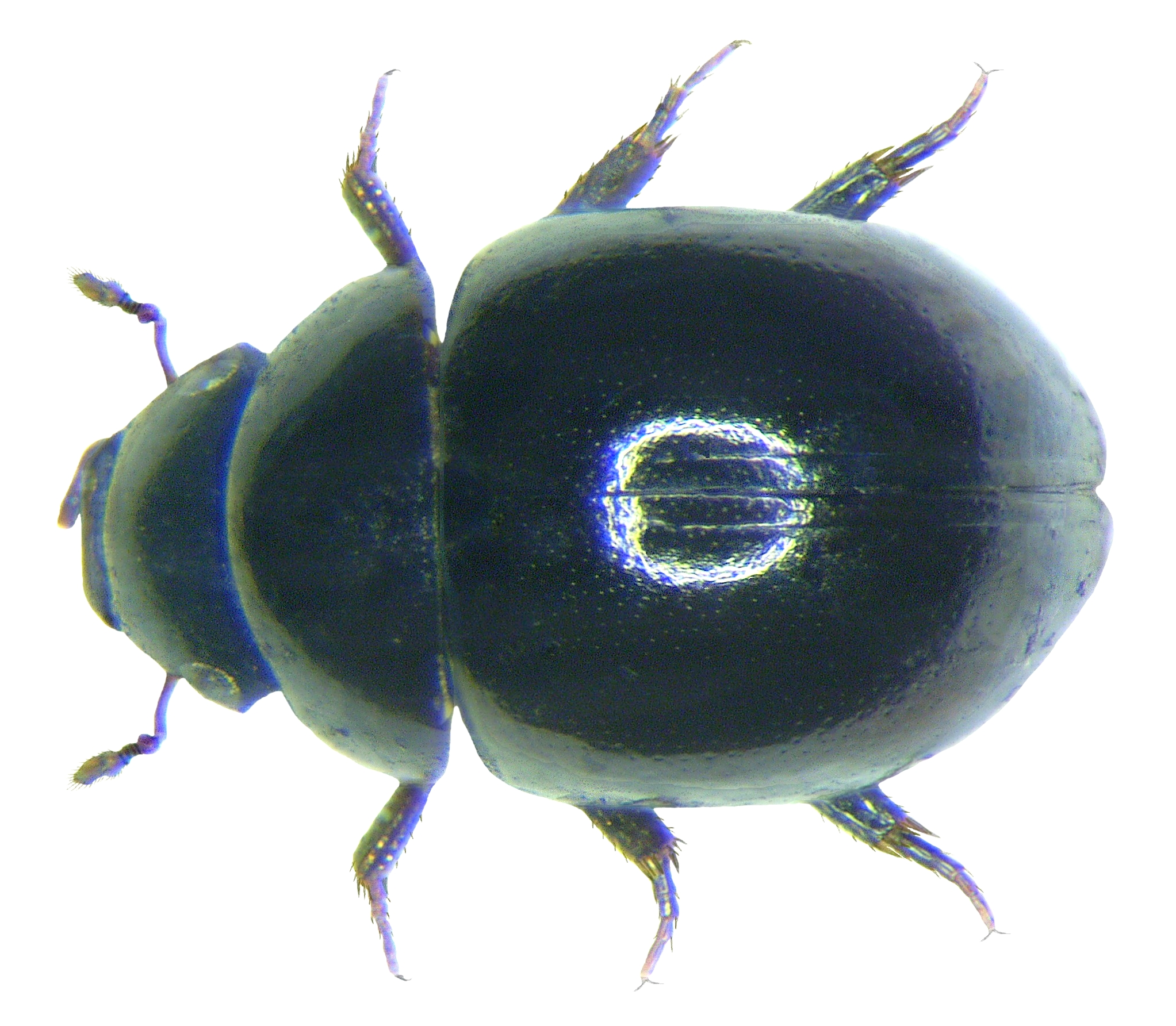
- Chaetarthria seminulum

Scientific classification
- Kingdom: Animalia
- Phylum: Arthropoda
- Clade: Pancrustacea
- Class: Insecta
- Order: Coleoptera
- Suborder: Polyphaga
- Infraorder: Staphyliniformia
- Family: Hydrophilidae
- Subfamily: Chaetarthriinae; Bedel, 1881

= Chaetarthriinae =

Tribe of beetles

Chaetarthriinae is a subfamily in the family Hydrophilidae of aquatic beetles, and it contains 92 species in 8 genera.

== Classification ==
The subfamily contains two tribes:

- Chaetharthriini constituted by the genera:
  - Apurebium García, 2002
  - Chaetharthria Stephens, 1835
  - Guyanobius Spangler, 1986
  - Hemisphaera Pandellé, 1876
  - Thysanarthria d'Orchymont, 1926
  - Venezuelobium García, 2002
- Anacaenini (including former Horelophinae)
  - Anacaena Thomson, 1859
  - Crenitis Bedel, 1881
  - Horelophus d'Orchymont, 1913
  - Notohydrus Balfour-Browne, 1939
  - Phelea Hansen, 1999
