= Cercyon subsolanus =

Scientific classification
- Kingdom: Animalia
- Phylum: Arthropoda
- Class: Insecta
- Order: Coleoptera
- Suborder: Polyphaga
- Infraorder: Staphyliniformia
- Family: Hydrophilidae
- Genus: Cercyon
- Species: C. subsolanus

Binomial name
- Cercyon subsolanus Balfour-Browne, 1939

Synonyms
- Cercyon (Paracycreon) subsolanus Balfour-Browne, 1939; Cercyon linearis Wu & Pu, 1995

Species of beetle

Cercyon subsolanus, is a species of water scavenger beetle found in Bhutan, China, India, Indonesia, Malaysia, Nepal, Philippines, Singapore, Sri Lanka, Thailand, and Vietnam.

== Description ==
Body length is about 2.6 to 3.2 mm.
