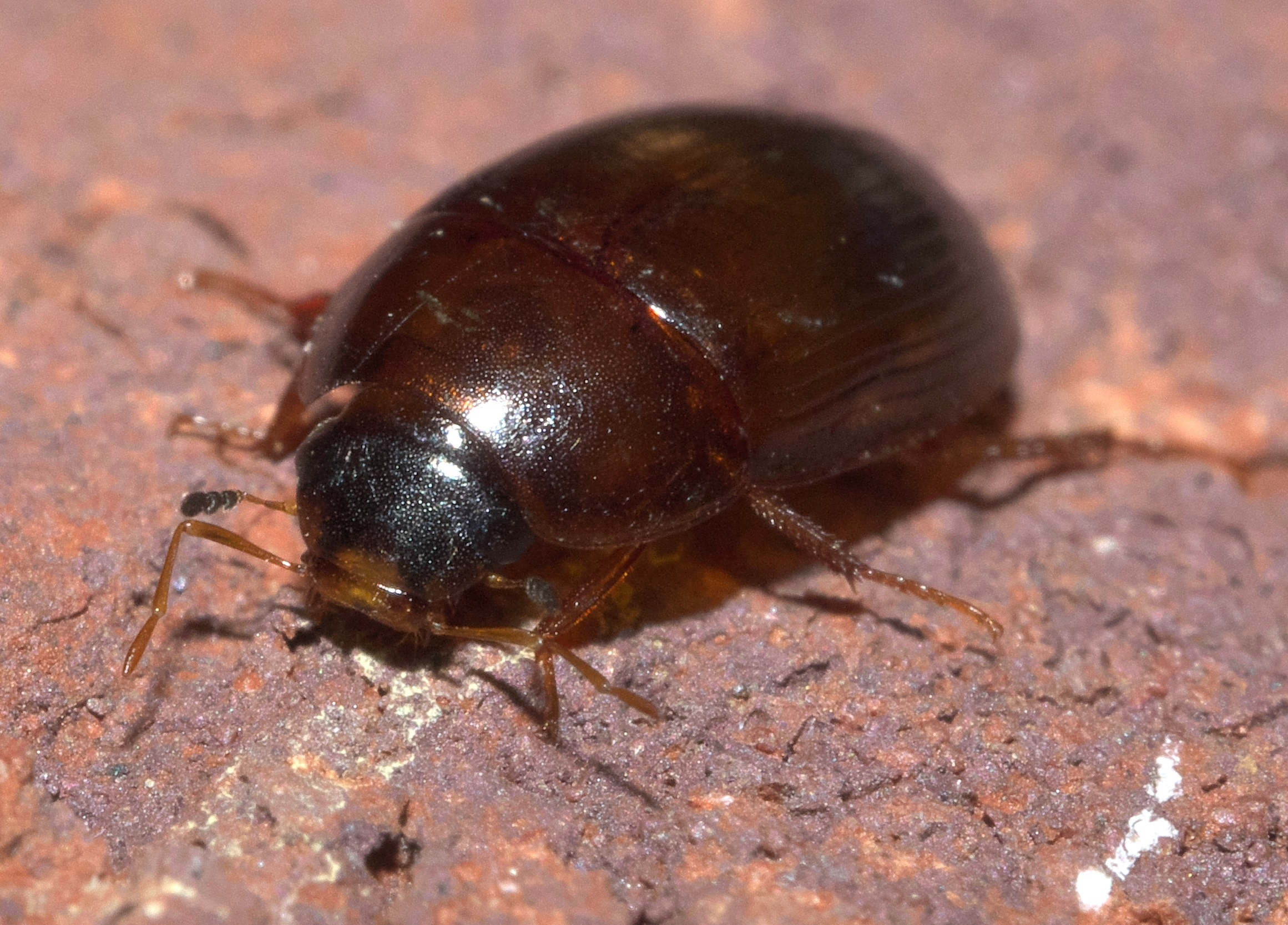

Scientific classification
- Kingdom: Animalia
- Phylum: Arthropoda
- Class: Insecta
- Order: Coleoptera
- Suborder: Polyphaga
- Infraorder: Staphyliniformia
- Family: Hydrophilidae
- Genus: Cymbiodyta
- Species: C. bifida

Binomial name
- Cymbiodyta bifida (LeConte, 1855)

Synonyms
- Helocombus bifidus

= Cymbiodyta bifidus =

Species of beetle

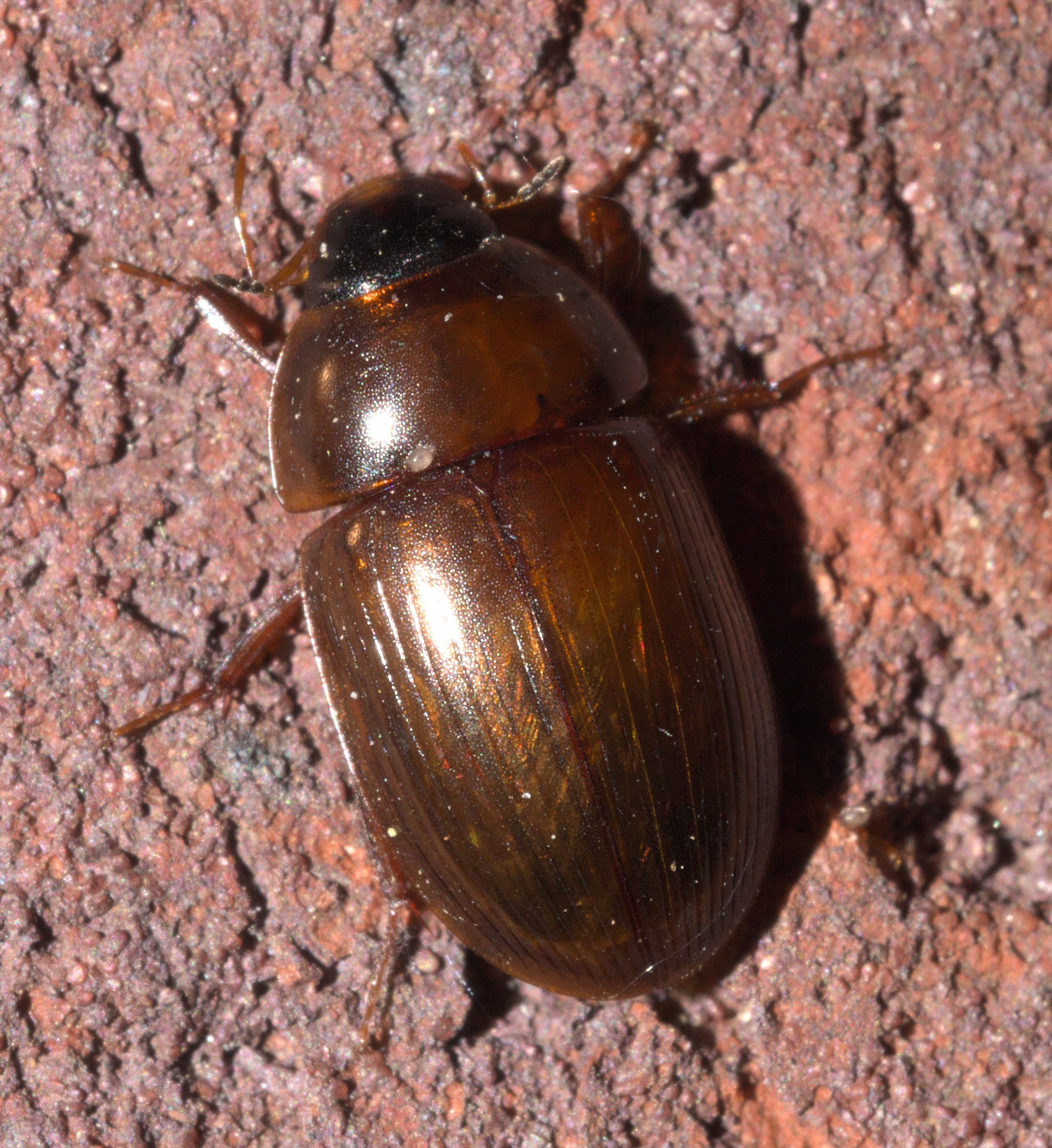
Cymbiodyta bifida, Oklahoma, 7.6 mm

Cymbiodyta bifida is a species of hydrophilid beetle. The species was formerly the sole member of the genus Helocombus.

== Description ==
Adult size ranges from 5.5 to 7.8 millimetres (0.22 to 0.31 in) in length. Their maxillary palpi are long and slender with the last segment shorter than the preceding segment and the pseudobasal segment concave inwardly. There is a pyramidal projection medially on the mesosternum, and the elytra have distinct striations. The middle and hind tarsi have four segments, while tarsal claws have a basal tooth in both males and females.

The antennae on larvae have basal segments that are slightly shorter of subequal to the remaining segments, with sensorium on the apex of segment 2. The labroclypeus has several smaller central teeth and two larger teeth on each side. The mandibles are symmetrical, and both have two inner teeth. Larvae also have well-developed legs, and the ligula is subequal to the length of the first palpal segment.

== Distribution ==
Cymbiodyta bifida ranges across much of eastern North America from Labrador south to central Florida and west to the Great Plains. It has been collected from pond and lake habitats containing emergent vegetation, such as sedges, as well as in slow moving streams.
