= Cercyon lineolatus =

Scientific classification
- Kingdom: Animalia
- Phylum: Arthropoda
- Class: Insecta
- Order: Coleoptera
- Suborder: Polyphaga
- Infraorder: Staphyliniformia
- Family: Hydrophilidae
- Genus: Cercyon
- Species: C. lineolatus

Binomial name
- Cercyon lineolatus (Motschulsky, 1863)

Synonyms
- Trichopoda lineolata Motschulsky, 1863; Cercyon lineolatus (Motschulsky) Gemminger & Harold, 1868; Cercyon (Clinocercyon) lineolatus (Motschulsky): Bameul, 1986.; Cercyon nigrostriatus Wu, Wu & Zhe-Long Pu, 1995

Species of beetle

Cercyon (Clinocercyon) lineolatus, is a species of water scavenger beetle found in several Oriental and Oceanian countries.

== Distribution ==
It is found in United Arab Emirates, China, Japan, Bangladesh, India, Indonesia, Laos, Malaysia, Nepal, Philippines, Singapore, Sri Lanka, Taiwan, Thailand, Vietnam, Palau, Mascarene Islands (Réunion and Mauritius).

== Description ==
This large sized terrestrial hydrophilid beetle with an elongated oval, moderately convex body has an average length of about 3.7 mm. Dorsum weakly shiny, however, ventrum mostly dark brown and without shine. Pronotum black with broad yellowish lateral margin. Elytra bicoloured, characteristic with black and light yellowish brown stripe visible among serial punctures. Antenna with 9 segments. Pronotum with coarse and dense punctures. Prosternum is well-developed, and carinates medially. Elytra rather coarse and dense punctures and with 10 distinct deeply impressed striae. Mesoventral tablet is slender, and pointed apically.

Adult beetles are coprophilous and are often found in cow and rabbit excrement. It is also found in aquatic environments, particularly from algae and gravel in the shallow littoral region.
