= Cercyon luniger =

Scientific classification
- Domain: Eukaryota
- Kingdom: Animalia
- Phylum: Arthropoda
- Class: Insecta
- Order: Coleoptera
- Suborder: Polyphaga
- Infraorder: Staphyliniformia
- Family: Hydrophilidae
- Genus: Cercyon
- Species: C. luniger

Binomial name
- Cercyon luniger Mannerheim, 1853

Species of beetle

Cercyon luniger is a species of water scavenger beetle in the family Hydrophilidae. It is found in Central America and North America.
