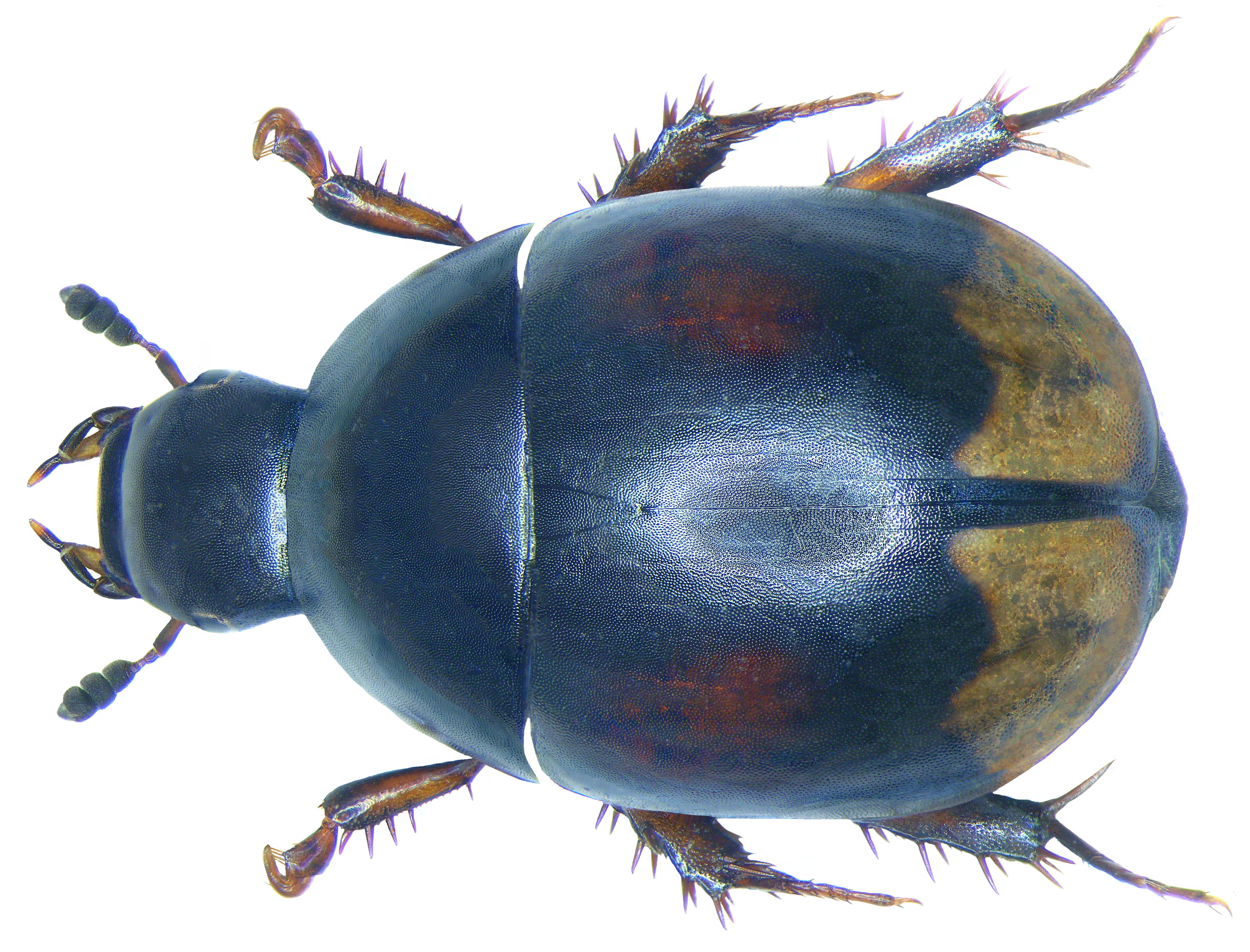

Scientific classification
- Kingdom: Animalia
- Phylum: Arthropoda
- Class: Insecta
- Order: Coleoptera
- Suborder: Polyphaga
- Infraorder: Staphyliniformia
- Family: Hydrophilidae
- Genus: Sphaeridium
- Species: S. lunatum

Binomial name
- Sphaeridium lunatum Fabricius, 1792

Synonyms
- Sphaeridium bimaculatum Ragusa, 1891; Sphaeridium inhumerale Csiki, 1953; Sphaeridium nigerrimum Reitter, 1909; Sphaeridium scarabaeoides lunatum Fabricius, 1792

= Sphaeridium lunatum =

Species of beetle

Sphaeridium lunatum is a species of water scavenger beetle in the family Hydrophilidae. It is found in Europe and Northern Asia (excluding China) and North America.

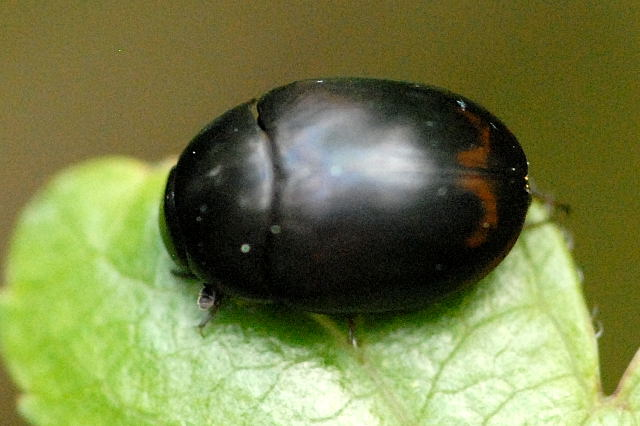
