= Cercyon praetextatus =

Scientific classification
- Domain: Eukaryota
- Kingdom: Animalia
- Phylum: Arthropoda
- Class: Insecta
- Order: Coleoptera
- Suborder: Polyphaga
- Infraorder: Staphyliniformia
- Family: Hydrophilidae
- Genus: Cercyon
- Species: C. praetextatus

Binomial name
- Cercyon praetextatus (Say, 1825)

Synonyms
- Cercyon testaceum Blatchley, 1923

Species of beetle

Cercyon praetextatus is a species of water scavenger beetle in the family Hydrophilidae. It is found in the Caribbean Sea, Central America, North America, and South America.
