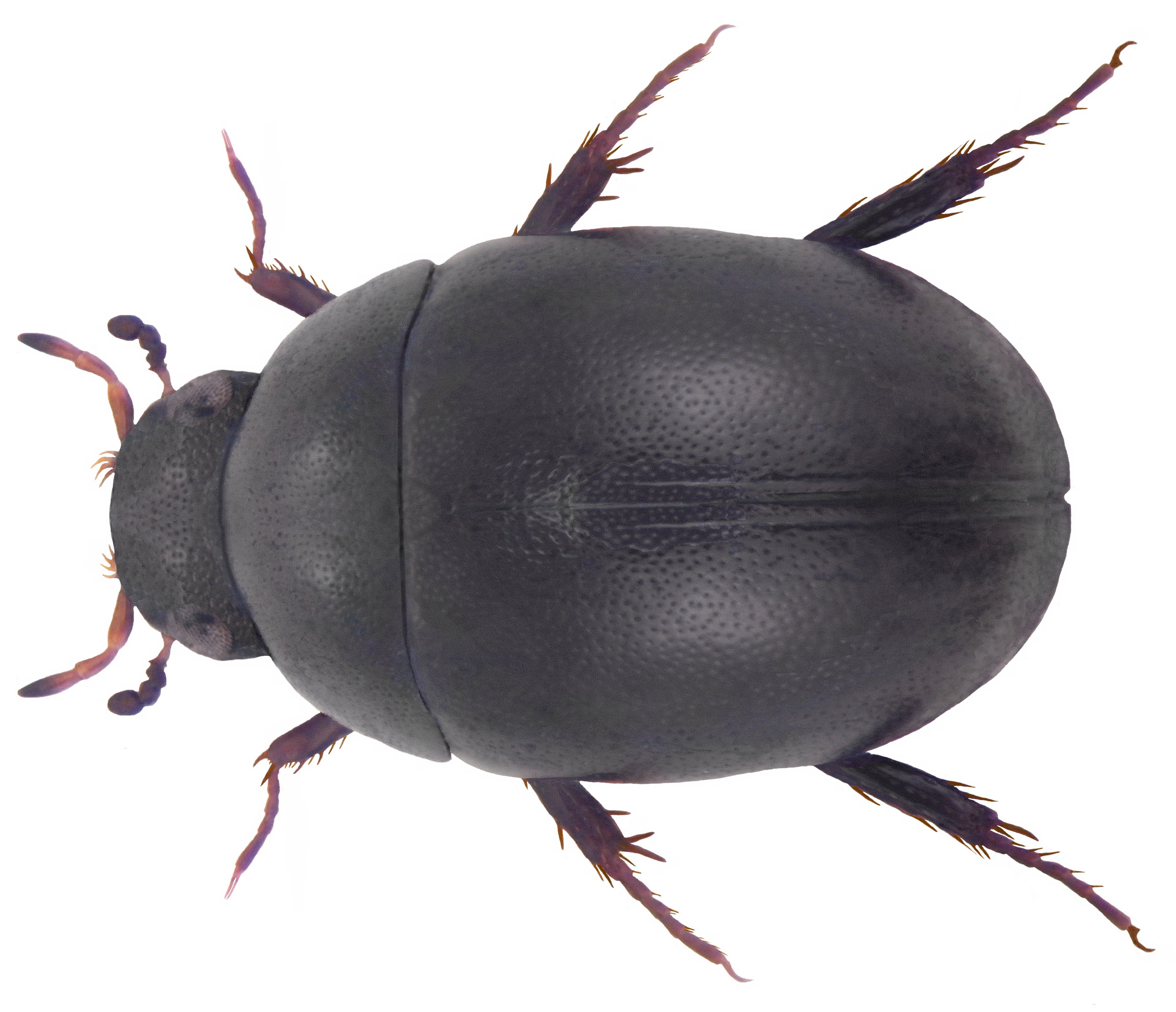
- Paracymuys scutellaris

Scientific classification
- Kingdom: Animalia
- Phylum: Arthropoda
- Class: Insecta
- Order: Coleoptera
- Suborder: Polyphaga
- Infraorder: Staphyliniformia
- Family: Hydrophilidae
- Subfamily: Hydrophilinae
- Tribe: Anacaenini
- Genus: Paracymus; Thomson, 1867

= Paracymus =

Genus of beetles

Paracymus is a genus of hydrophilid beetles with 81 species worldwide.

== Species ==
- Paracymus acutipenis Wooldridge, 1971
- Paracymus amplus Wooldridge, 1977
- Paracymus armatus (Sharp, 1882)
- Paracymus blandus Wooldridge, 1976
- Paracymus communis Wooldridge, 1966
- Paracymus confluens Wooldridge, 1966
- Paracymus confusus Wooldridge, 1966
- Paracymus corrinae Wooldridge, 1969
- Paracymus delatus Wooldridge, 1971
- Paracymus degener (Horn, 1890)
- Paracymus desolatus Wooldridge, 19736
- Paracymus despectus (LeConte, 1863)
- Paracymus diligens Wooldridge, 1977
- Paracymus dispersus Wooldridge, 1966
- Paracymus elegans (Fall, 1901)
- Paracymus ellipsis (Fall, 1910)
- Paracymus exiguus Wooldridge, 1977
- Paracymus generosus Wooldridge, 1977
- Paracymus giganticus Wooldridge, 1973
- Paracymus incomptus Wooldridge, 1977
- Paracymus indigens Wooldridge, 1969
- Paracymus insularis Wooldridge, 1973
- Paracymus leechi Wooldridge, 1969
- Paracymus limbatus Wooldridge, 1973
- Paracymus lodingi (Fall, 1910)
- Paracymus metallescens Fauvel, 1883
- Paracymus mexicanus Wooldridge, 1969
- Paracymus mimicus Wooldridge, 1977
- Paracymus monticola Wooldridge, 1977
- Paracymus nanus (Fall, 1910)
- Paracymus ornatus Wooldridge, 1977
- Paracymus pacatus Wooldridge, 1976
- Paracymus petulans Wooldridge, 1977
- Paracymus placidus Wooldridge, 1973
- Paracymus propius Wooldridge, 1977
- Paracymus pusillus Wooldridge, 1977
- Paracymus reductus (Fall, 1910)
- Paracymus regularis Wooldridge, 1969
- Paracymus restrictus Wooldridge, 1966
- Paracymus robustus Wooldridge, 1973
- Paracymus seclusus Wooldridge, 1978
- Paracymus scutellaris (Rosenhauer, 1856)
- Paracymus simulatus Wooldridge, 1976
- Paracymus spangleri Wooldridge, 1969
- Paracymus subcupreus (Say, 1825)
- Paracymus tarsalis Miler, 1963
- Paracymus vulgatus Wooldridge, 1977
