= Cercyon littoralis =

Scientific classification
- Kingdom: Animalia
- Phylum: Arthropoda
- Class: Insecta
- Order: Coleoptera
- Suborder: Polyphaga
- Infraorder: Staphyliniformia
- Family: Hydrophilidae
- Genus: Cercyon
- Species: C. littoralis

Binomial name
- Cercyon littoralis (Gyllenhal, 1808)

Species of beetle

Cercyon littoralis is a species of water scavenger beetle in the family Hydrophilidae. It is found in Europe and Northern Asia (excluding China) and North America.
