= Cymbiodyta vindicata =

Scientific classification
- Domain: Eukaryota
- Kingdom: Animalia
- Phylum: Arthropoda
- Class: Insecta
- Order: Coleoptera
- Suborder: Polyphaga
- Infraorder: Staphyliniformia
- Family: Hydrophilidae
- Genus: Cymbiodyta
- Species: C. vindicata

Binomial name
- Cymbiodyta vindicata Fall, 1924

Species of beetle

Cymbiodyta vindicata is a species of water scavenger beetle in the family Hydrophilidae. It is found in North America.
