= Cercyon analis =

Scientific classification
- Kingdom: Animalia
- Phylum: Arthropoda
- Clade: Pancrustacea
- Class: Insecta
- Order: Coleoptera
- Suborder: Polyphaga
- Infraorder: Staphyliniformia
- Family: Hydrophilidae
- Genus: Cercyon
- Species: C. analis

Binomial name
- Cercyon analis (Paykull, 1798)

Synonyms
- Cercyon falli Winters, 1944; Cercyon maculatum Melsheimer, 1846; Cercyon maculatus Melsheimer, 1846

Species of beetle

Cercyon analis is a species of water scavenger beetle in the family Hydrophilidae. It is found in Australia, Europe and Northern Asia (excluding China), and North America.
