= Cercyon herceus =

Scientific classification
- Domain: Eukaryota
- Kingdom: Animalia
- Phylum: Arthropoda
- Class: Insecta
- Order: Coleoptera
- Suborder: Polyphaga
- Infraorder: Staphyliniformia
- Family: Hydrophilidae
- Genus: Cercyon
- Species: C. herceus

Binomial name
- Cercyon herceus Smetana, 1978

Species of beetle

Cercyon herceus is a species of water scavenger beetle in the family Hydrophilidae. It is found in North America.

== Subspecies ==
These two subspecies belong to the species Cercyon herceus:

- Cercyon herceus frigidus Smetana, 1978
- Cercyon herceus herceus Smetana, 1978
