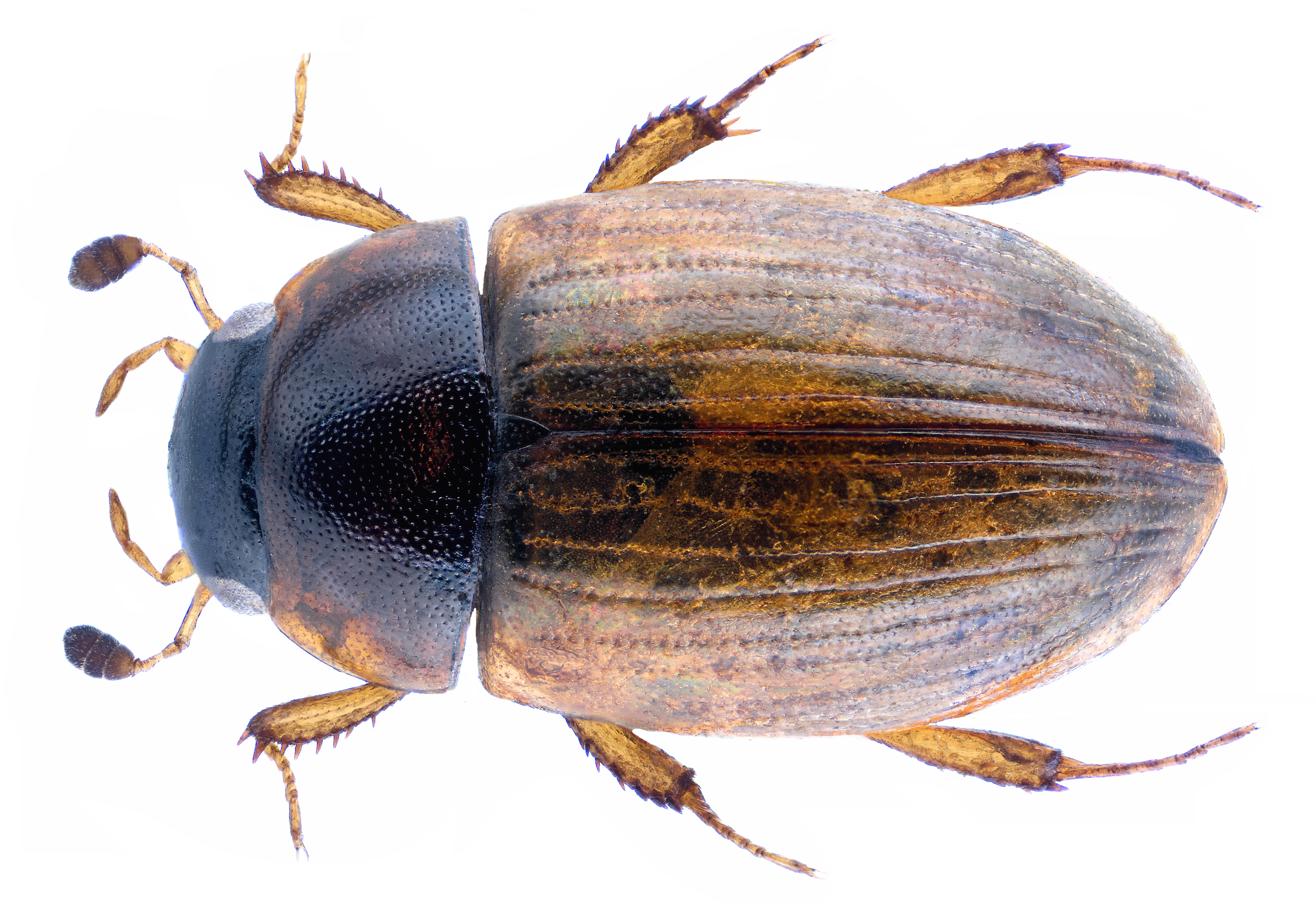

Scientific classification
- Kingdom: Animalia
- Phylum: Arthropoda
- Class: Insecta
- Order: Coleoptera
- Suborder: Polyphaga
- Infraorder: Staphyliniformia
- Family: Hydrophilidae
- Genus: Cercyon
- Species: C. quisquilius

Binomial name
- Cercyon quisquilius (Linnaeus, 1761)

= Cercyon quisquilius =

Species of beetle

Cercyon quisquilius is a species of water scavenger beetle in the family Hydrophilidae. It is found in Africa, Australia, Europe and Northern Asia (excluding China), Central America, North America, Oceania, South America, and Southern Asia.

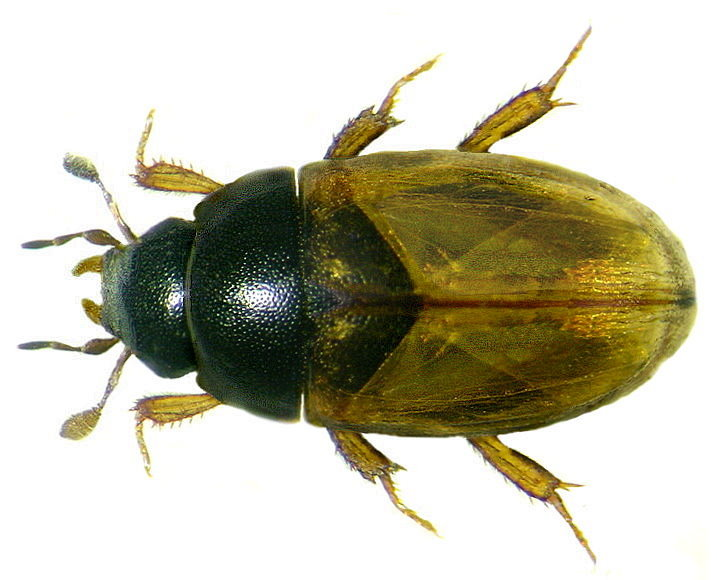
