= Deltostethus columbiensis =

Scientific classification
- Kingdom: Animalia
- Phylum: Arthropoda
- Class: Insecta
- Order: Coleoptera
- Suborder: Polyphaga
- Infraorder: Staphyliniformia
- Family: Hydrophilidae
- Genus: Deltostethus
- Species: D. columbiensis

Binomial name
- Deltostethus columbiensis (Hatch, 1965)

Synonyms
- Pelosoma columbiensis Hatch, 1965

Species of beetle

Deltostethus columbiensis is a species of water scavenger beetle in the family Hydrophilidae. It is found in Central America and North America.
