= Oosternum attacomis =

Scientific classification
- Domain: Eukaryota
- Kingdom: Animalia
- Phylum: Arthropoda
- Class: Insecta
- Order: Coleoptera
- Suborder: Polyphaga
- Infraorder: Staphyliniformia
- Family: Hydrophilidae
- Genus: Oosternum
- Species: O. attacomis

Binomial name
- Oosternum attacomis Spangler, 1962

Species of beetle

Oosternum attacomis is a species of water scavenger beetle in the family Hydrophilidae. It is found in North America.
