= Oosternum costatum =

Scientific classification
- Domain: Eukaryota
- Kingdom: Animalia
- Phylum: Arthropoda
- Class: Insecta
- Order: Coleoptera
- Suborder: Polyphaga
- Infraorder: Staphyliniformia
- Family: Hydrophilidae
- Genus: Oosternum
- Species: O. costatum

Binomial name
- Oosternum costatum (LeConte, 1855)

Species of beetle

Oosternum costatum is a species of water scavenger beetle in the family Hydrophilidae. It is found in North America.
