= Megasternini =

Scientific classification
- Kingdom: Animalia
- Phylum: Arthropoda
- Clade: Pancrustacea
- Class: Insecta
- Order: Coleoptera
- Suborder: Polyphaga
- Infraorder: Staphyliniformia
- Family: Hydrophilidae
- Subfamily: Sphaeridiinae
- Tribe: Megasternini; Mulsant, 1844

Tribe of beetles

Megasternini is a tribe of water scavenger beetles in the family Hydrophilidae. There are at least 70 described species in Megasternini.

== Genera ==
- Agna Smetana, 1978
- Cercyon Leach, 1817
- Cryptopleurum Mulsant, 1844
- Cycrillum Knisch, 1921
- Deltostethus Sharp, 1882
- Megasternum Mulsant, 1844
- Oosternum Sharp, 1882
- Paraoosternum Scott, 1913
- Pelosoma Mulsant, 1844
- Tectosternum Balfour-Browne, 1958
