= Cercyon nigriceps =

Scientific classification
- Kingdom: Animalia
- Phylum: Arthropoda
- Class: Insecta
- Order: Coleoptera
- Suborder: Polyphaga
- Infraorder: Staphyliniformia
- Family: Hydrophilidae
- Genus: Cercyon
- Species: C. nigriceps

Binomial name
- Cercyon nigriceps (Marsham, 1802)

Synonyms
- See text

Species of beetle

Cercyon (Cercyon) nigriceps, is a species of water scavenger beetle with cosmopolitan distribution from Palaearctic, Nearctic, Afrotropical, Oriental and Neotropical regional countries.

== Description ==
Body oval with slightly convex and shiny dorsum without microsculpture. Head is black whereas clypeus is linear, and truncate anteriorly. Head and pronotum with fine and dense punctuations. Maxillary palpi are yellowish to brownish yellow in color with darker ultimate segment. Antennae yellowish to brownish. Pronotum transverse and brownish, where the anterior side and lateral margins are brownish yellow or yellow. Scutellum brownish, with very finely and sparsely punctuations. Elytra yellow or brownish yellow in color with nine complete deep and one short punctate stria. Elytal intervals are shallow and with fine, regular punctations. Ventrum dark brown or black. Proventrite is tectiform, and finely carinate medially. Epipleura is flat, and horizontal. Metasternal pentagon is flat, and shiny, with very dense shallow punctuations. Legs are yellowish or brownish yellow with much paler tarsi.

Adults are frequently found from horse dung, cow dung and other mammalian excreta as well as in rotting plants.

== Distribution ==
It is found in following countries: Austria, Azores, Belarus, Britain, Canary Islands, Croatia, Czech Republic, Slovakia, Denmark, Estonia, Finland, France, Germany, Hungary, Ireland, Italy, Japan, Latvia, Lithuania, Madeira, Malta, the Netherlands, Norway, Poland, Portugal, Romania, Russia, Sweden, Switzerland, Tunisia, Ukraine, Canada, USA, Jamaica, Lesser Antilles (Tobago), Panama, Paraguay, Argentina, Botswana, Gambia, Madagascar, Mascarene islands, Namibia, Rwanda, Saudi Arabia, Seychelles, Tanzania, Democratic Republic of the Congo, Bhutan, Nepal, China, Taiwan, India, Sri Lanka, Vietnam, Laos, Thailand, Indonesia, Philippines.

== Synonyms ==
Due to the large geographical range and difficulty in identification, several taxonomical descriptions and revisions have been recorded.

- Dermestes nigriceps Marsham, 1802
- Sphaeridium melanocephalus var. nigriceps Marsham, 1802
- Dermestes atricapillus Marsham, 1802
- Dermestes melanocephalus var. atricapillus (Marsham, 1802)
- Cercyon atricapillum (Marsham, 1802)
- Cercyon nigriceps var. atricapillum (Marsham, 1802)
- Dermestes laevis Marsham, 1802
- Cercyon laeve (Marsham, 1802)
- Dermestes inustus Marsham, 1802
- Cercyon inustum (Marsham, 1802)
- Sphaeridium centrimaculatum Sturm, 1807
- Cercyon centrimaculatum (Sturm, 1807)
- Cambrus centromaculatus Sturm, 1807
- Cercyon (s. str.) nigriceps var. centrimaculatum (Sturm, 1807)
- Cercyon nigriceps ab. centromaculatus (Sturm, 1807)
- Cercyon atriceps Stephens, 1829
- Cercyon nigriceps var. atriceps Stephens, 1839
- Cercyon ustulatum Stephens, 1829
- Cercyon bimaculatum Stephens, 1829
- Cercyon testaceum Stephens, 1829
- Cercyon nubilipenne Stephens, 1835
- Cercyon troglodytes Dejean, 1836
- Cercyon pulchellum Heer, 1841
- Cercyon mundum Melsheimer, 1844
- Cercyon vicinale Walker, 1859
- Cercyon nigriceps Motschulsky, 1863
- Cercyon nigriceps ab. simplex Delahon, 1913
- Cercyon atricapillus (Marsham, 1802)
- Cercyon nigriceps (Marsham, 1802)
