= Crenitis morata =

Scientific classification
- Domain: Eukaryota
- Kingdom: Animalia
- Phylum: Arthropoda
- Class: Insecta
- Order: Coleoptera
- Suborder: Polyphaga
- Infraorder: Staphyliniformia
- Family: Hydrophilidae
- Genus: Crenitis
- Species: C. morata

Binomial name
- Crenitis morata (Horn, 1890)

Species of beetle

Crenitis morata is a species of water scavenger beetle in the family Hydrophilidae.
