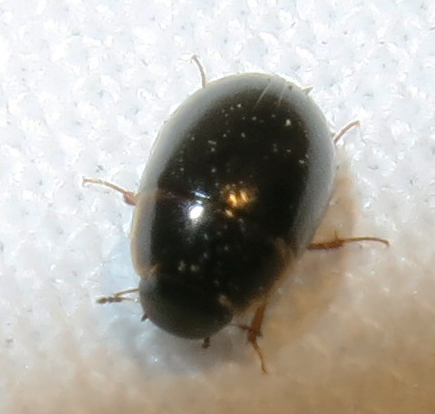

Scientific classification
- Kingdom: Animalia
- Phylum: Arthropoda
- Clade: Pancrustacea
- Class: Insecta
- Order: Coleoptera
- Suborder: Polyphaga
- Infraorder: Staphyliniformia
- Family: Hydrophilidae
- Genus: Anacaena
- Species: A. limbata

Binomial name
- Anacaena limbata (Fabricius, 1792)

Synonyms
- Anacaena infuscatus (Motschulsky, 1859)

= Anacaena limbata =

Species of beetle

Anacaena limbata is a species of water scavenger beetle in the family Hydrophilidae. It is found in Europe and Northern Asia (excluding China) and North America.
