= Anacaena signaticollis =

Scientific classification
- Domain: Eukaryota
- Kingdom: Animalia
- Phylum: Arthropoda
- Class: Insecta
- Order: Coleoptera
- Suborder: Polyphaga
- Infraorder: Staphyliniformia
- Family: Hydrophilidae
- Genus: Anacaena
- Species: A. signaticollis

Binomial name
- Anacaena signaticollis Fall, 1924

Species of beetle

Anacaena signaticollis is a species of water scavenger beetle in the family Hydrophilidae. It is found in North America.
