= Sphaeridium bipustulatum =

Scientific classification
- Kingdom: Animalia
- Phylum: Arthropoda
- Class: Insecta
- Order: Coleoptera
- Suborder: Polyphaga
- Infraorder: Staphyliniformia
- Family: Hydrophilidae
- Genus: Sphaeridium
- Species: S. bipustulatum

Binomial name
- Sphaeridium bipustulatum Fabricius, 1781

Species of beetle

Sphaeridium bipustulatum is a species of water scavenger beetle in the family Hydrophilidae. It is found in Africa, Europe and Northern Asia (excluding China), and North America.
