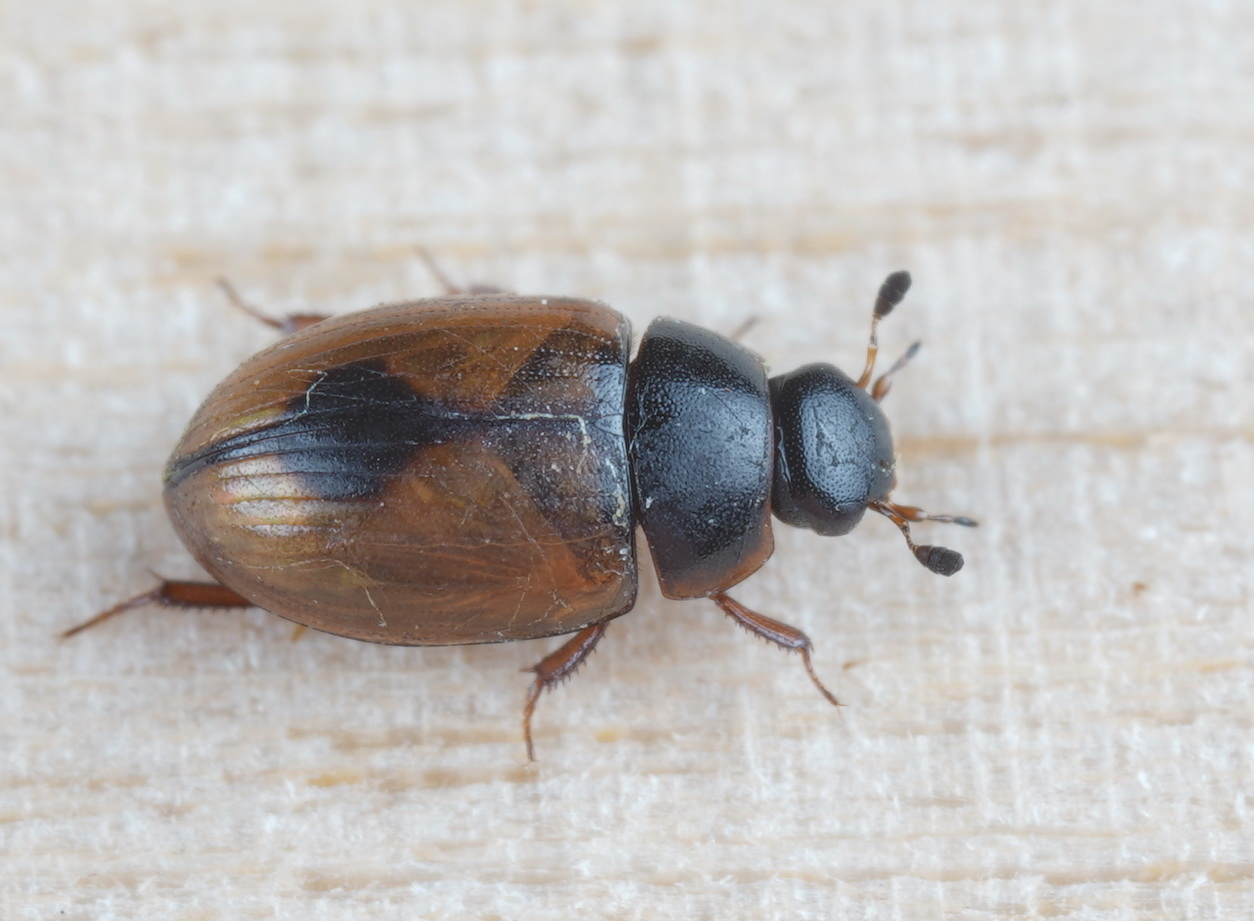

Scientific classification
- Kingdom: Animalia
- Phylum: Arthropoda
- Class: Insecta
- Order: Coleoptera
- Suborder: Polyphaga
- Infraorder: Staphyliniformia
- Family: Hydrophilidae
- Genus: Cercyon
- Species: C. unipunctatus

Binomial name
- Cercyon unipunctatus (Linnaeus, 1758)

= Cercyon unipunctatus =

Species of beetle

Cercyon unipunctatus is a species of water scavenger beetle in the family Hydrophilidae. It is found in Europe and Northern Asia (excluding China), North America, and Southern Asia.
