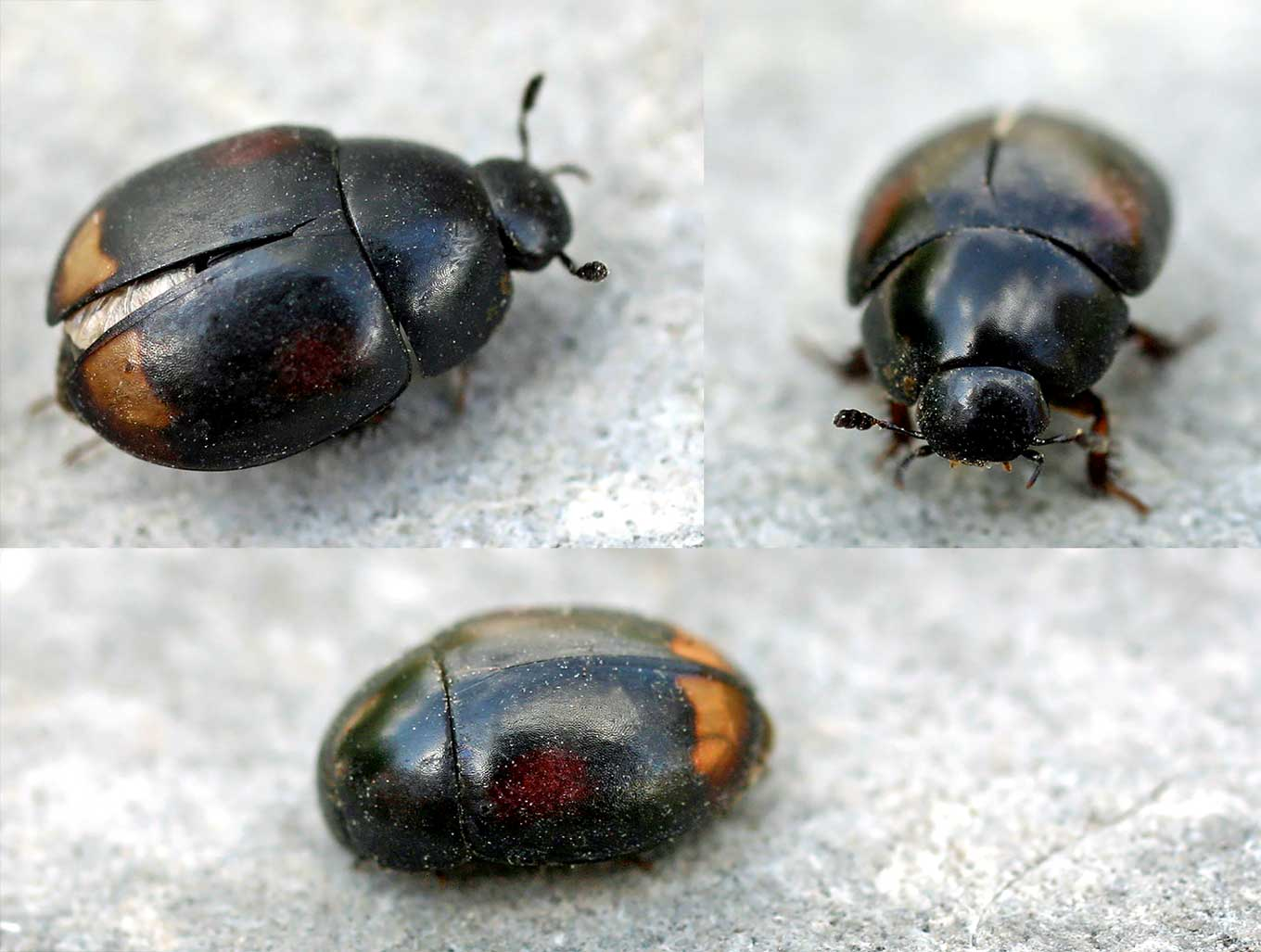

Scientific classification
- Kingdom: Animalia
- Phylum: Arthropoda
- Class: Insecta
- Order: Coleoptera
- Suborder: Polyphaga
- Infraorder: Staphyliniformia
- Family: Hydrophilidae
- Genus: Sphaeridium
- Species: S. scarabaeoides

Binomial name
- Sphaeridium scarabaeoides (Linnaeus, 1758)

= Sphaeridium scarabaeoides =

Species of beetle

Sphaeridium scarabaeoides is a species of water scavenger beetle in the family Hydrophilidae. It is found in Africa, Europe and Northern Asia (excluding China), North America, Oceania, and Southern Asia.

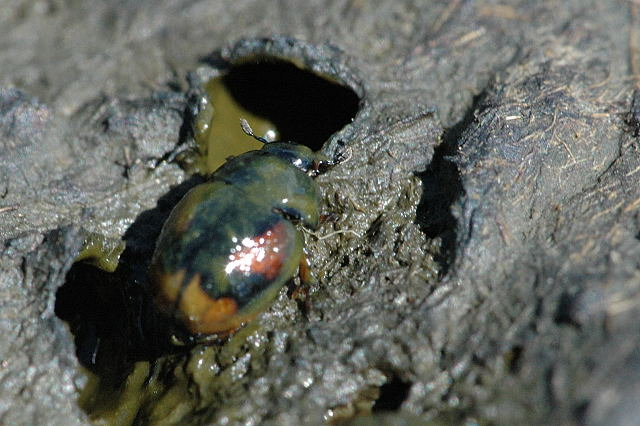
