= Sphaeridium quinquemaculatum =

Scientific classification
- Kingdom: Animalia
- Phylum: Arthropoda
- Class: Insecta
- Order: Coleoptera
- Suborder: Polyphaga
- Infraorder: Staphyliniformia
- Family: Hydrophilidae
- Genus: Sphaeridium
- Species: S. quinquemaculatum

Binomial name
- Sphaeridium quinquemaculatum Fabricius, 1798

Synonyms
- Sphaeridium quinquemaculatum Fabricius, 1798; Sphaeridium quinquemaculatum Biswas and Mukhopadhyay, 1995; Sphaeridium 5maculatum Fabricius, 1798; Sphaeridium chinense J.Frivaldszky, 1889; Sphaeridium tricolor Walker, 1858; Sphaeridium vicinum Laporte de Castelnau, 1840

Species of beetle

Sphaeridium quinquemaculatum, is a species of water scavenger beetle found in India, China, Indonesia, Nepal, Sri Lanka, Laos, Thailand and the Philippines.
