= Paracymus nanus =

Scientific classification
- Domain: Eukaryota
- Kingdom: Animalia
- Phylum: Arthropoda
- Class: Insecta
- Order: Coleoptera
- Suborder: Polyphaga
- Infraorder: Staphyliniformia
- Family: Hydrophilidae
- Genus: Paracymus
- Species: P. nanus

Binomial name
- Paracymus nanus (Fall, 1910)

Species of beetle

Paracymus nanus is a species of water scavenger beetle in the family Hydrophilidae. It is found in the Caribbean Sea and North America.
