= Deltostethus =

Scientific classification
- Kingdom: Animalia
- Phylum: Arthropoda
- Class: Insecta
- Order: Coleoptera
- Suborder: Polyphaga
- Infraorder: Staphyliniformia
- Family: Hydrophilidae
- Tribe: Megasternini
- Genus: Deltostethus; Sharp, 1882

Genus of beetles

Deltostethus is a genus of water scavenger beetles in the family Hydrophilidae. There are at least four described species in Deltostethus.

== Species ==
These four species belong to the genus Deltostethus:

- Deltostethus columbiensis (Hatch, 1965)
- Deltostethus palpalis Sharp, 1882
- Deltostethus scitulus Spangler & Huacuja
- Deltostethus sulcatus Sharp, 1882
