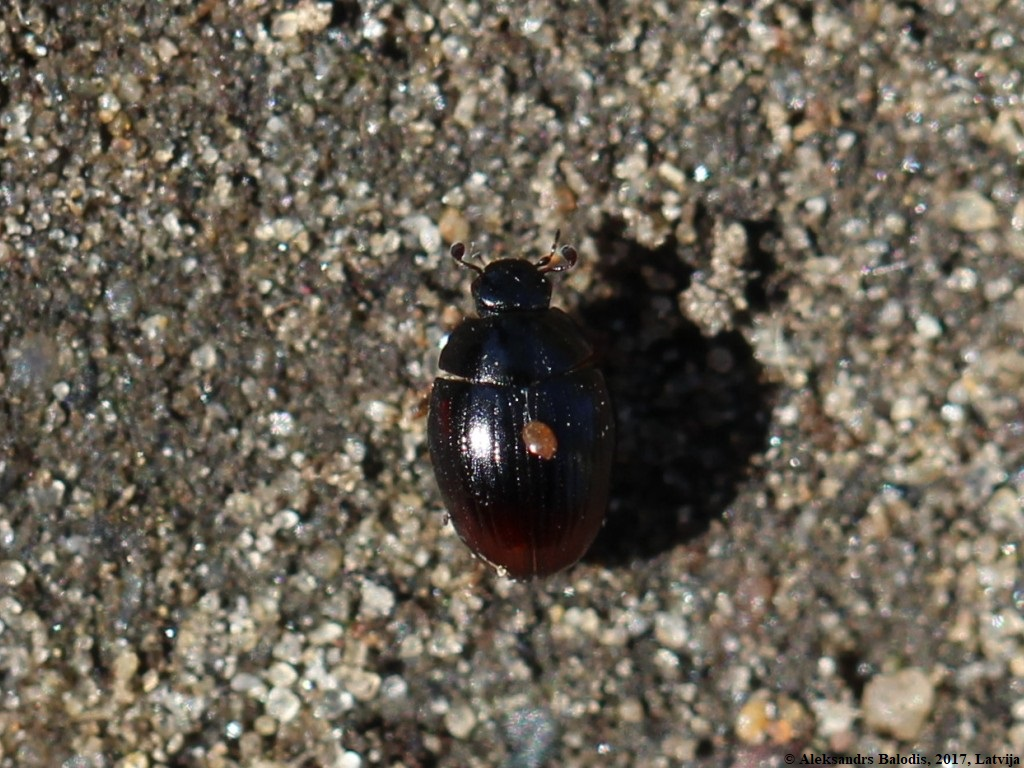

Scientific classification
- Domain: Eukaryota
- Kingdom: Animalia
- Phylum: Arthropoda
- Class: Insecta
- Order: Coleoptera
- Suborder: Polyphaga
- Infraorder: Staphyliniformia
- Family: Hydrophilidae
- Genus: Cercyon
- Species: C. haemorrhoidalis

Binomial name
- Cercyon haemorrhoidalis (Fabricius, 1775)

Synonyms
- Cercyon basillaris Notman, 1920

= Cercyon haemorrhoidalis =

Species of beetle

Cercyon haemorrhoidalis is a species of water scavenger beetle in the family Hydrophilidae. It is found in Australia, Europe and Northern Asia (excluding China), North America, and Southern Asia.
