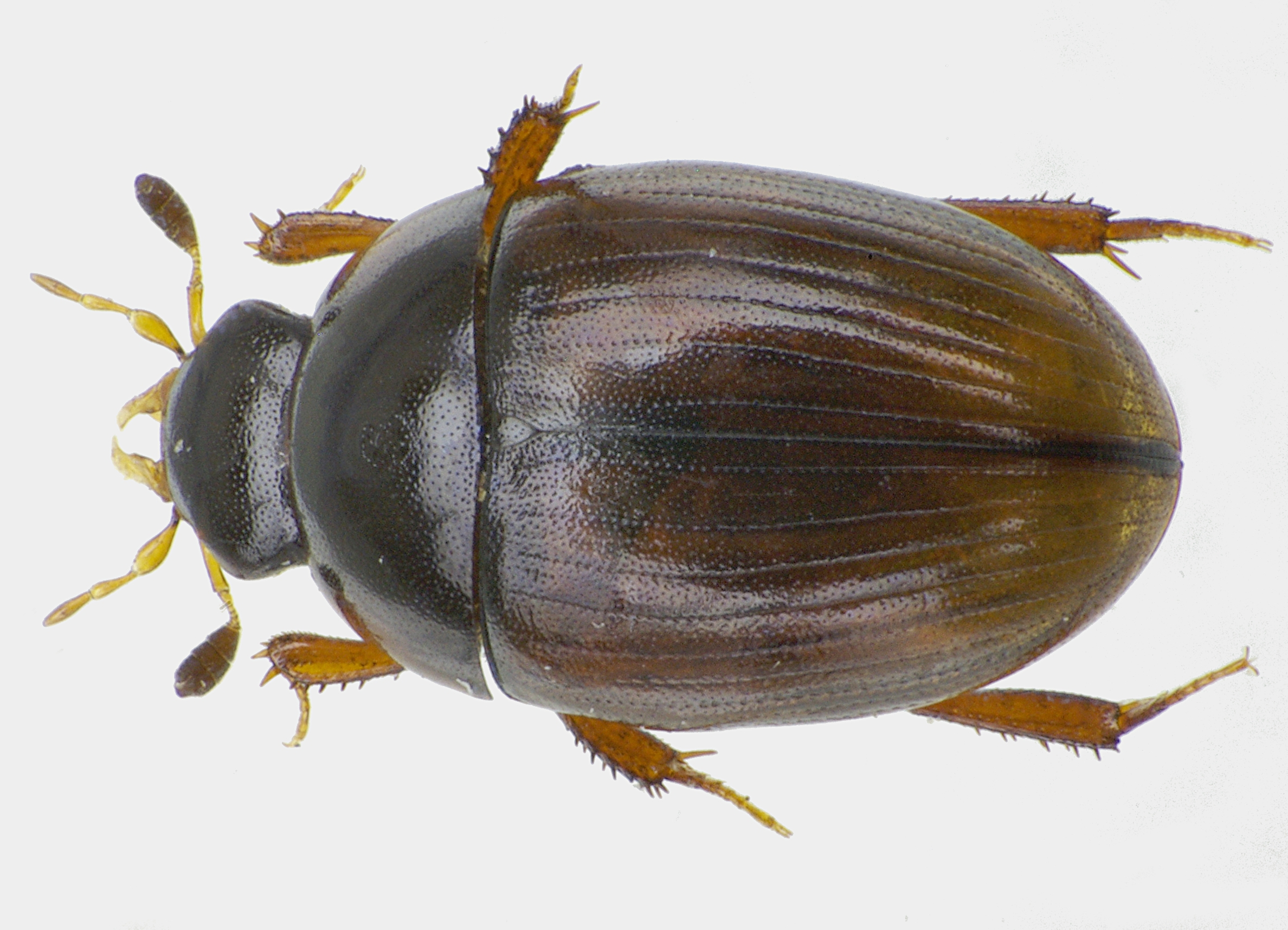

Scientific classification
- Domain: Eukaryota
- Kingdom: Animalia
- Phylum: Arthropoda
- Class: Insecta
- Order: Coleoptera
- Suborder: Polyphaga
- Infraorder: Staphyliniformia
- Family: Hydrophilidae
- Genus: Cercyon
- Species: C. lateralis

Binomial name
- Cercyon lateralis (Marsham, 1802)

Synonyms
- Cercyon incrematus Notman, 1920

= Cercyon lateralis =

Species of beetle

Cercyon lateralis is a species of water scavenger beetle in the family Hydrophilidae. It is found in North America and Europe.
