= Tectosternum =

Scientific classification
- Domain: Eukaryota
- Kingdom: Animalia
- Phylum: Arthropoda
- Class: Insecta
- Order: Coleoptera
- Suborder: Polyphaga
- Infraorder: Staphyliniformia
- Family: Hydrophilidae
- Tribe: Megasternini
- Genus: Tectosternum; Balfour-Browne, 1958

Synonyms
- Genyon Smetana, 1978

Genus of beetles

Tectosternum is a genus of water scavenger beetles in the family Hydrophilidae. There is one described species in Tectosternum, T. naviculare.
