= Cymbiodyta dorsalis =

Scientific classification
- Domain: Eukaryota
- Kingdom: Animalia
- Phylum: Arthropoda
- Class: Insecta
- Order: Coleoptera
- Suborder: Polyphaga
- Infraorder: Staphyliniformia
- Family: Hydrophilidae
- Genus: Cymbiodyta
- Species: C. dorsalis

Binomial name
- Cymbiodyta dorsalis (Motschulsky, 1859)

Synonyms
- Cymbiodyta morata Horn, 1890

Species of beetle

Cymbiodyta dorsalis is a species of water scavenger beetle in the family Hydrophilidae. It is found in Central America and North America.
