= Paracymus confluens =

Scientific classification
- Domain: Eukaryota
- Kingdom: Animalia
- Phylum: Arthropoda
- Class: Insecta
- Order: Coleoptera
- Suborder: Polyphaga
- Infraorder: Staphyliniformia
- Family: Hydrophilidae
- Genus: Paracymus
- Species: P. confluens

Binomial name
- Paracymus confluens Wooldridge, 1966

Species of beetle

Paracymus confluens is a species of water scavenger beetle in the family Hydrophilidae. It is found in North America.
