= Paracymus elegans =

Scientific classification
- Kingdom: Animalia
- Phylum: Arthropoda
- Class: Insecta
- Order: Coleoptera
- Suborder: Polyphaga
- Infraorder: Staphyliniformia
- Family: Hydrophilidae
- Genus: Paracymus
- Species: P. elegans

Binomial name
- Paracymus elegans (Fall, 1901)

Synonyms
- Creniphilus elegans Fall, 1901

Species of beetle

Paracymus elegans is a species of water scavenger beetles in the subfamily Hydrophilinae. It is found in the Southern California.
