= Oosternum =

Scientific classification
- Kingdom: Animalia
- Phylum: Arthropoda
- Class: Insecta
- Order: Coleoptera
- Suborder: Polyphaga
- Infraorder: Staphyliniformia
- Family: Hydrophilidae
- Tribe: Megasternini
- Genus: Oosternum; Sharp, 1882

Synonyms
- Pemelus Horn, 1890

Genus of beetles

Oosternum is a genus of water scavenger beetles in the family Hydrophilidae. There are more than 20 described species in Oosternum.

== Species ==
These 23 species belong to the genus Oosternum:

- Oosternum acutheca
- Oosternum aequinoctiale Motschulsky, 1855
- Oosternum andersoni Deler-Hernández, Cala-Riquelme & Fikáček, 2014
- Oosternum attacomis Spangler, 1962
- Oosternum attenuatum
- Oosternum bacharenge Deler-Hernández, Cala-Riquelme & Fikáček, 2014
- Oosternum cercyonoides Deler-Hernández, Cala-Riquelme & Fikáček, 2014
- Oosternum cicatricosum
- Oosternum convexum
- Oosternum costatum (LeConte, 1855)
- Oosternum gibbicolle
- Oosternum holosericeum
- Oosternum horni d'Orchymont, 1914
- Oosternum insulare Deler-Hernández, Cala-Riquelme & Fikáček, 2014
- Oosternum intermedium
- Oosternum latum Fikacek, Hebauer & Hansen, 2009
- Oosternum luciae Deler-Hernández, Cala-Riquelme & Fikáček, 2014
- Oosternum megnai Deler-Hernández, Cala-Riquelme & Fikáček, 2014
- Oosternum okinawaense Hoshina, 2011
- Oosternum pecki Deler-Hernández, Cala-Riquelme & Fikáček, 2014
- Oosternum pubescens (LeConte, 1855)
- Oosternum sharpi Hansen, 1999
- Oosternum simplex
