= Cercyon laminatus =

Scientific classification
- Kingdom: Animalia
- Phylum: Arthropoda
- Class: Insecta
- Order: Coleoptera
- Suborder: Polyphaga
- Infraorder: Staphyliniformia
- Family: Hydrophilidae
- Genus: Cercyon
- Species: C. laminatus

Binomial name
- Cercyon laminatus Sharp, 1873

Species of beetle

Cercyon laminatus is a species of water scavenger beetle in the family Hydrophilidae. It is found in Europe and Northern Asia (excluding China), Oceania, Southern Asia, and North America.
