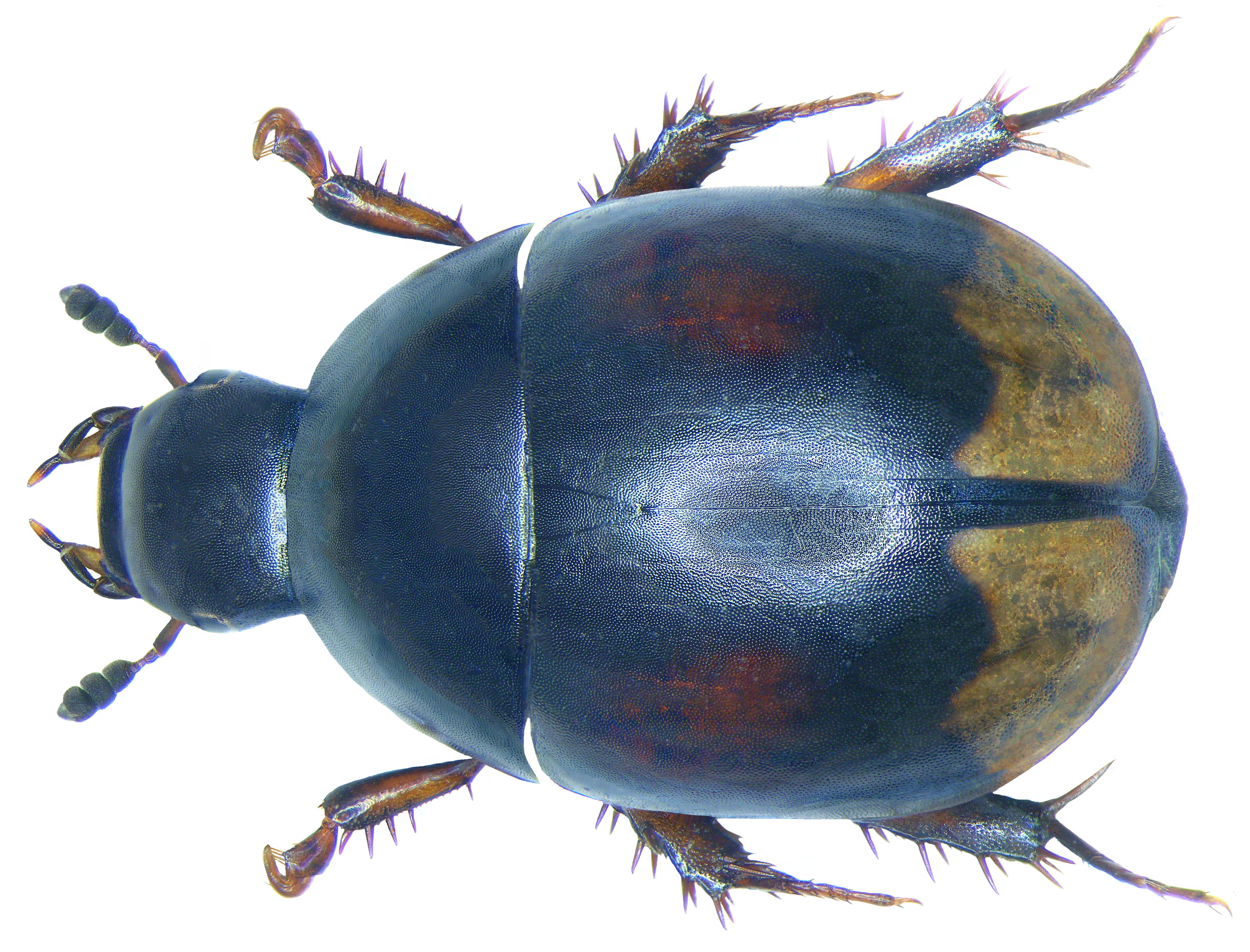
- Sphaeridium lunatum

Scientific classification
- Kingdom: Animalia
- Phylum: Arthropoda
- Class: Insecta
- Order: Coleoptera
- Suborder: Polyphaga
- Infraorder: Staphyliniformia
- Family: Hydrophilidae
- Subfamily: Sphaeridiinae
- Genus: Sphaeridium; Fabricius, 1775

Species
- see text

= Sphaeridium =

Genus of beetles

Sphaeridium is a genus of beetles in the family Hydrophilidae, the water scavenger beetles. They occur in Europe, and some species have been introduced to North America.

== Description ==
The adults are 4 to 7.5 millimeters long. They have short antennae with hairy clubs at the tips.

These beetles live in cow dung. The adults feed on the dung and other organic matter, but the beetle larvae are predators of the maggots of the flies that breed in the dung, such as the face fly (Musca autumnalis). Two or more Sphaeridium beetle species may coexist in one pat, and the larvae may feed on each other. The female beetle deposits several eggs encased in a cocoon.

== Species ==
Species include:

- Sphaeridium abbreviatum Boheman, 1851
- Sphaeridium abditum Orchymont, 1943
- Sphaeridium abductum J.Balfour-Browne, 1950
- Sphaeridium affine Berge Henegouwen, 1987
- Sphaeridium aschenborni Berge Henegouwen, 1992
- Sphaeridium balfourbrownei M.Hansen, 1999
- Sphaeridium bipunctatum Thunberg, 1794
- Sphaeridium bipustulatum Fabricius, 1781
- Sphaeridium bisinuatum J.Balfour-Browne, 1950
- Sphaeridium bottegoi Marcuzzi, 1941
- Sphaeridium braziliense Berge Henegouwen, 1986
- Sphaeridium caffrum Laporte de Castelnau, 1840
- Sphaeridium chrysomelinum (Klug, 1833)
- Sphaeridium circumcinctum Régimbart, 1907
- Sphaeridium corradinii Marcuzzi, 1941
- Sphaeridium daemonicum Fikáček & Kropáček, 2015
- Sphaeridium densepunctatum Berlov & Shatrovskiy, 1989
- Sphaeridium dimidiatum Gory, 1834
- Sphaeridium discolor Orchymont, 1933
- Sphaeridium dolum J.Balfour-Browne, 1950
- Sphaeridium exile Boheman, 1851
- Sphaeridium eximium Berge Henegouwen, 1992
- Sphaeridium fallaciosum J.Balfour-Browne, 1950
- Sphaeridium flavomaculatum Orchymont, 1924
- Sphaeridium huijbregtsi Berge Henegouwen, 1986
- Sphaeridium inopinatum J.Balfour-Browne, 1958
- Sphaeridium inquinatum Kugelann, 1798
- Sphaeridium jongemai Berge Henegouwen, 1987
- Sphaeridium kolleri Orchymont, 1925
- Sphaeridium lunatum Fabricius, 1792
- Sphaeridium marginatum Fabricius, 1787
- Sphaeridium melanarium Gistel, 1831
- Sphaeridium ornatum Boheman, 1851
- Sphaeridium ortivum Orchymont, 1943
- Sphaeridium pellucidum Rossi, 1794
- Sphaeridium plagiatum Thunberg, 1794
- Sphaeridium punctiforme Schrank, 1798
- Sphaeridium quinquemaculatum Fabricius, 1798
- Sphaeridium rubrum Thunberg, 1794
- Sphaeridium ruficolle Frolich, 1792
- Sphaeridium rufipes Schrank, 1785
- Sphaeridium scarabaeoides (Linnaeus, 1758)
- Sphaeridium senegalense Laporte de Castelnau, 1840
- Sphaeridium seriatum Orchymont, 1913
- Sphaeridium severini Orchymont, 1919
- Sphaeridium sigillum Orchymont, 1943
- Sphaeridium simplicipes Marcuzzi, 1941
- Sphaeridium substriatum Faldermann, 1838
- Sphaeridium testudineum Rossi, 1794
- Sphaeridium thomsoni Orchymont, 1919
- Sphaeridium vaccarium Kugelann, 1798
- Sphaeridium vitalisi Orchymont, 1925
- Sphaeridium weiri Berge Henegouwen, 1992
