= Chaetarthria pallida =

Scientific classification
- Domain: Eukaryota
- Kingdom: Animalia
- Phylum: Arthropoda
- Class: Insecta
- Order: Coleoptera
- Suborder: Polyphaga
- Infraorder: Staphyliniformia
- Family: Hydrophilidae
- Genus: Chaetarthria
- Species: C. pallida

Binomial name
- Chaetarthria pallida (LeConte, 1861)

Species of beetle

Chaetarthria pallida is a species of water scavenger beetle in the family Hydrophilidae. It is found in Central America and North America.
