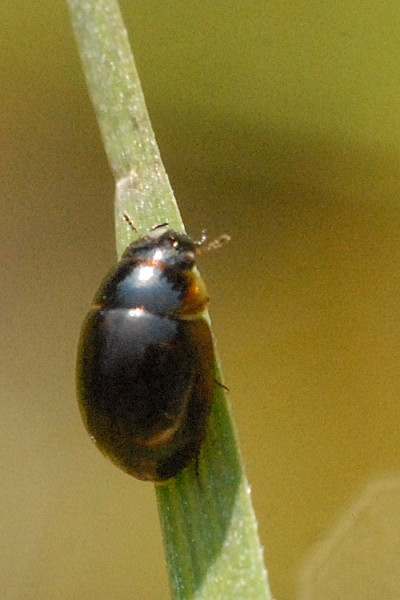

Scientific classification
- Kingdom: Animalia
- Phylum: Arthropoda
- Class: Insecta
- Order: Coleoptera
- Suborder: Polyphaga
- Infraorder: Staphyliniformia
- Family: Hydrophilidae
- Genus: Anacaena
- Species: A. lutescens

Binomial name
- Anacaena lutescens (Stephens, 1829)

= Anacaena lutescens =

Species of beetle

Anacaena lutescens is a species of water scavenger beetle in the family Hydrophilidae. It is found in Africa, Europe and Northern Asia (excluding China), and North America.

Anacaena lutescens mainly resides in shallow acid bogs or standing pools, which are examples of dystrophic environments. They are crucial for network cohesion and density in these areas, which contributes to the overall ecological balance of these shallow bogs/standing pools.
