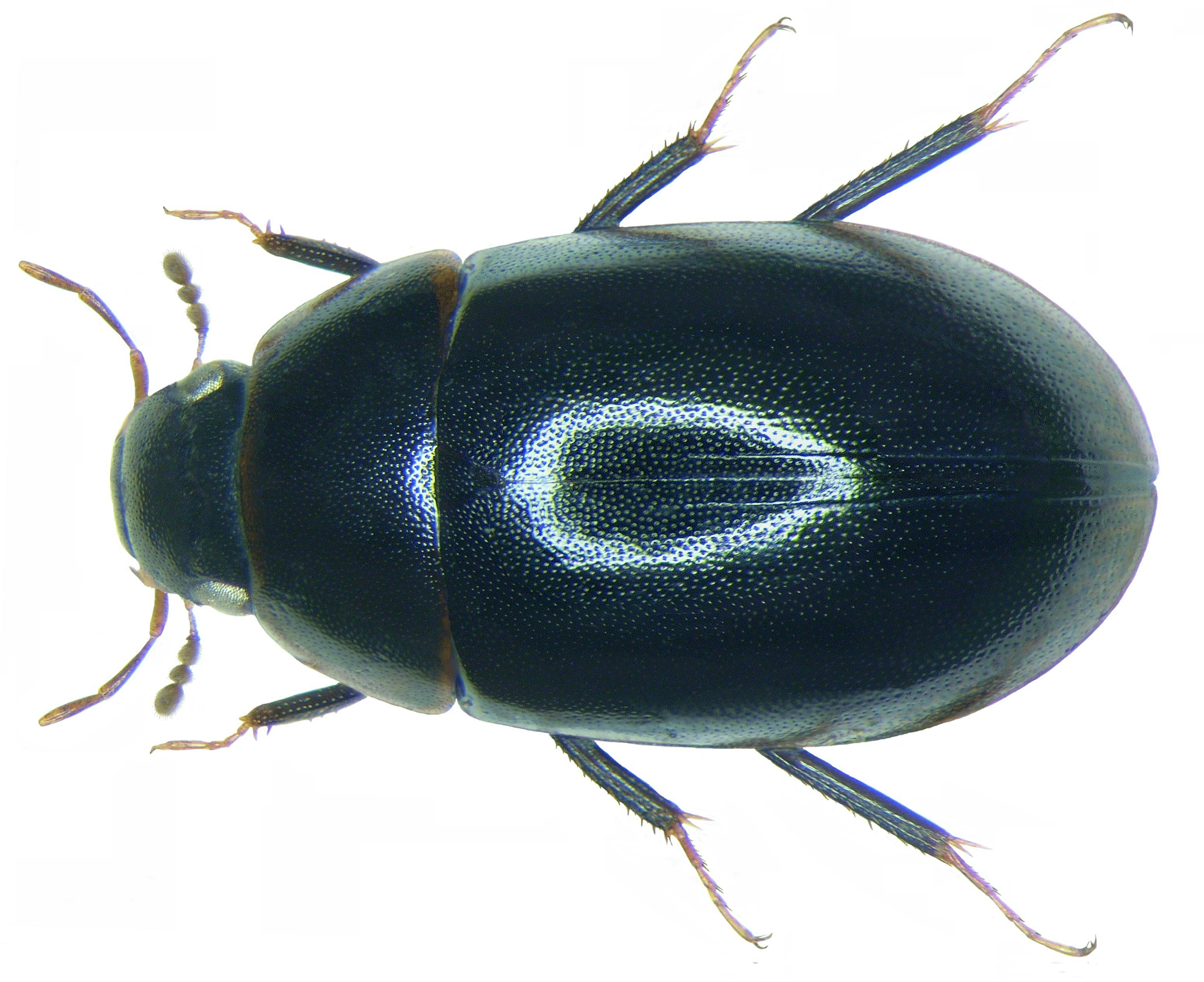
- Cymbiodyta marginella

Scientific classification
- Kingdom: Animalia
- Phylum: Arthropoda
- Class: Insecta
- Order: Coleoptera
- Suborder: Polyphaga
- Infraorder: Staphyliniformia
- Family: Hydrophilidae
- Tribe: Hydrophilini
- Genus: Cymbiodyta; Bedel, 1881

= Cymbiodyta =

Genus of beetles

Cymbiodyta is a genus of hydrophilid beetles with 31 species. Twenty–eight of the species occur in the Americas and three species in the Palearctic.

== Species ==
- Cymbiodyta acuminata Fall, 1924
- Cymbiodyta arizonica Smetana, 1974
- Cymbiodyta beckeri Smetana, 1974
- Cymbiodyta blanchardi Horn, 1890
- Cymbiodyta brevicollis (Sharp, 1882)
- Cymbiodyta brevipalpis Smetana, 1974
- Cymbiodyta campbelli Smetana, 1974
- Cymbiodyta chamberlaini Smetana, 1974
- Cymbiodyta columbiana Leech, 1948
- Cymbiodyta dorsalis (Motschulsky, 1859)
- Cymbiodyta eumera Smetana, 1974
- Cymbiodyta fraterculus (Sharp, 1882)
- Cymbiodyta howdeni Smetana, 1974
- Cymbiodyta imbellis (LeConte, 1861)
- Cymbiodyta leechi Miller, 1964
- Cymbiodyta lishizheni Jia & Lin, 2015
- Cymbiodyta marginella (Fabricius, 1792)
- Cymbiodyta minima Notman, 1919
- Cymbiodyta occidentalis Smetana, 1974
- Cymbiodyta orientalis Jia & Short, 2010
- Cymbiodyta pacifica Leech, 1948
- Cymbiodyta polita (Sharp, 1882)
- Cymbiodyta pseudopacifica Smetana, 1974
- Cymbiodyta puella Smetana, 1974
- Cymbiodyta punctatostriata (Zimmerman, 1869)
- Cymbiodyta pusilla Smetana, 1974
- Cymbiodyta rotunda (Say, 1825)
- Cymbiodyta semistriata (Zimmermann, 1869)
- Cymbiodyta seriata Smetana, 1974
- Cymbiodyta toddi Spangler, 1966
- Cymbiodyta vindicata Fall, 1924
