= Crenitis =

Scientific classification
- Domain: Eukaryota
- Kingdom: Animalia
- Phylum: Arthropoda
- Class: Insecta
- Order: Coleoptera
- Suborder: Polyphaga
- Infraorder: Staphyliniformia
- Family: Hydrophilidae
- Tribe: Anacaenini
- Genus: Crenitis; Bedel, 1881

Genus of beetles

Crenitis is a genus of water scavenger beetles in the family Hydrophilidae. There are about 19 described species in Crenitis.

== Species ==
These 19 species belong to the genus Crenitis:

- Crenitis aduncata
- Crenitis alticola (Fall, 1924)
- Crenitis apicalis Reitter, 1896
- Crenitis convexa Ji & Komarek, 2003
- Crenitis digesta (LeConte, 1855)
- Crenitis dissimilis (Horn, 1873)
- Crenitis formosana Hebauer, 1994
- Crenitis lianggeqiui
- Crenitis longula (Fall, 1924)
- Crenitis maculifrons Brown, 1940
- Crenitis malkini Miller, 1965
- Crenitis monticola (Horn, 1890)
- Crenitis morata (Horn, 1890)
- Crenitis obovata
- Crenitis palpalis Miller, 1965
- Crenitis paradigma (Orchymont, 1942)
- Crenitis rufiventris (Horn, 1873)
- Crenitis satoi Hebauer, 1994
- Crenitis snoqualmie Miller, 1965
