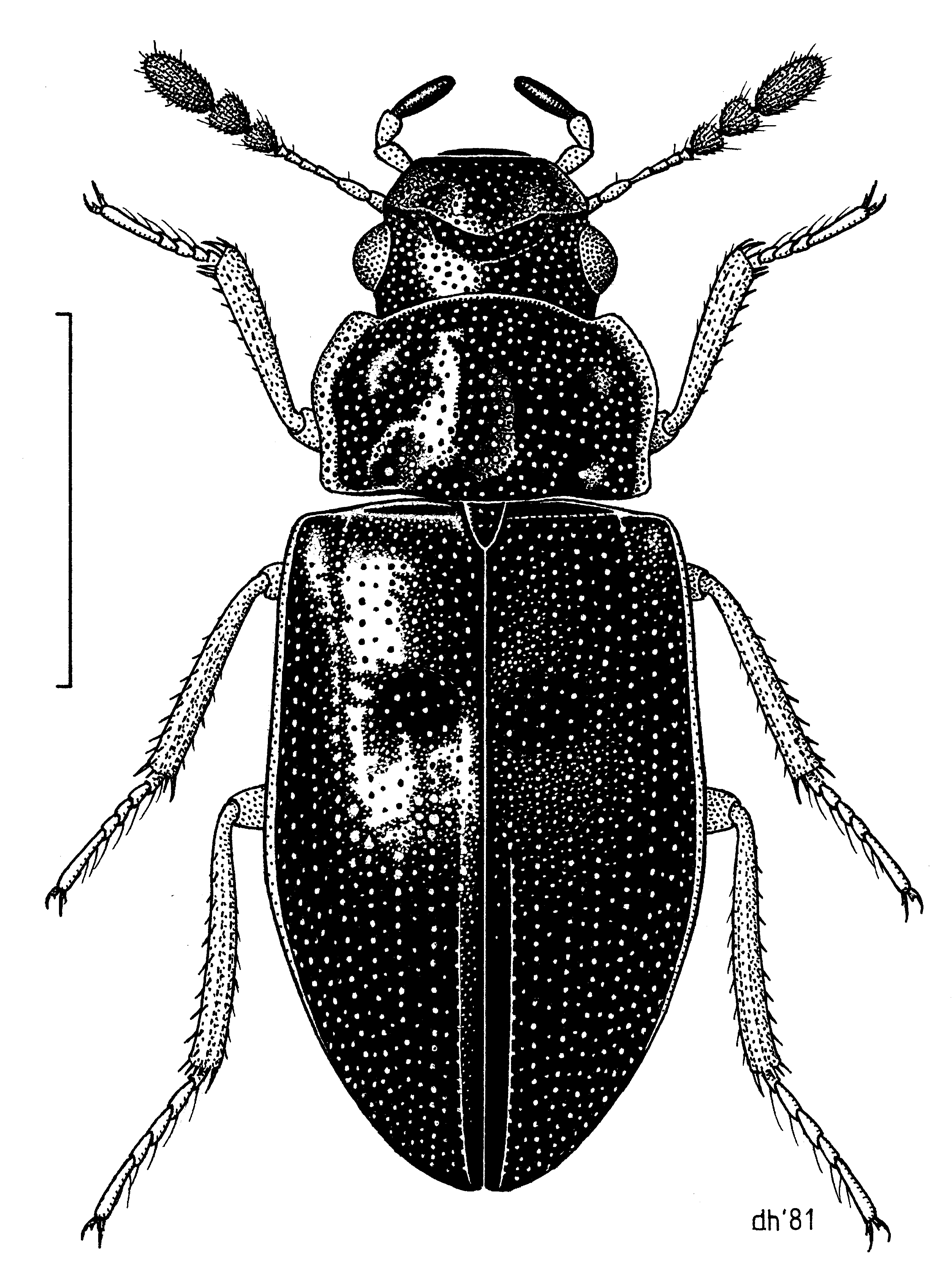

Scientific classification
- Kingdom: Animalia
- Phylum: Arthropoda
- Class: Insecta
- Order: Coleoptera
- Suborder: Polyphaga
- Infraorder: Staphyliniformia
- Family: Hydrophilidae
- Genus: Horelophus d'Orchymont, 1902
- Species: H. walkeri

Binomial name
- Horelophus walkeri d'Orchymont, 1913
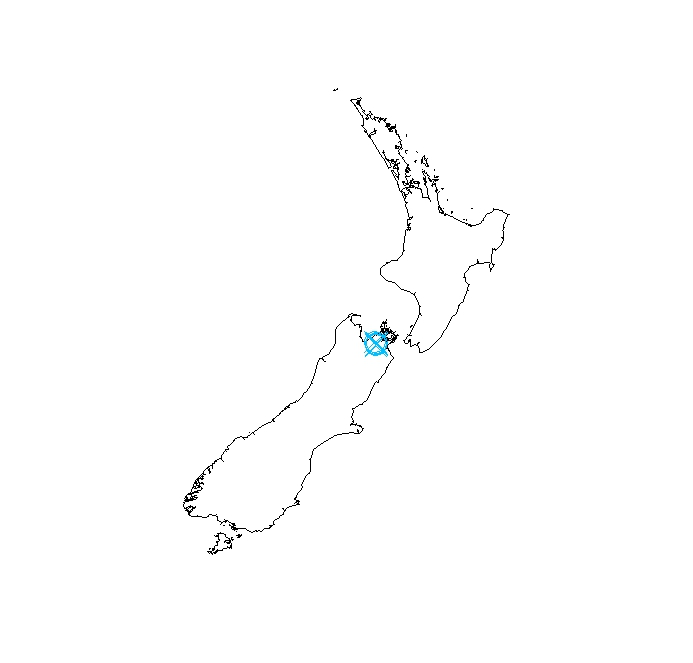
- Observations on iNaturalist

= Horelophus =

Horelophus walkeri

Genus of beetles

Horelophus is a genus of beetles in the family Hydrophilidae, which was erected in 1913 by d'Orchymont and named for Commander J. J. Walker. It is monotypic as its sole species is Horelophus walkeri, endemic to New Zealand.

== Distribution and habitat ==
Horelophus walkeri is endemic to the northern South Island of New Zealand, from the districts of Marlborough, Nelson and Buller.

Although beetles in the family Hydrophilidae are considered as water scavenging beetles, Horelophus walkeri is not believed to be able to swim and is considered a terrestrial beetle. Few specimens have been collected or observed, each were located on exposed, wet rocks along streams and waterfalls within the Pelorus River, Buller River and Motueka River catchments, where they feed on algae. Individuals were also found hiding within rock crevices and moss.
