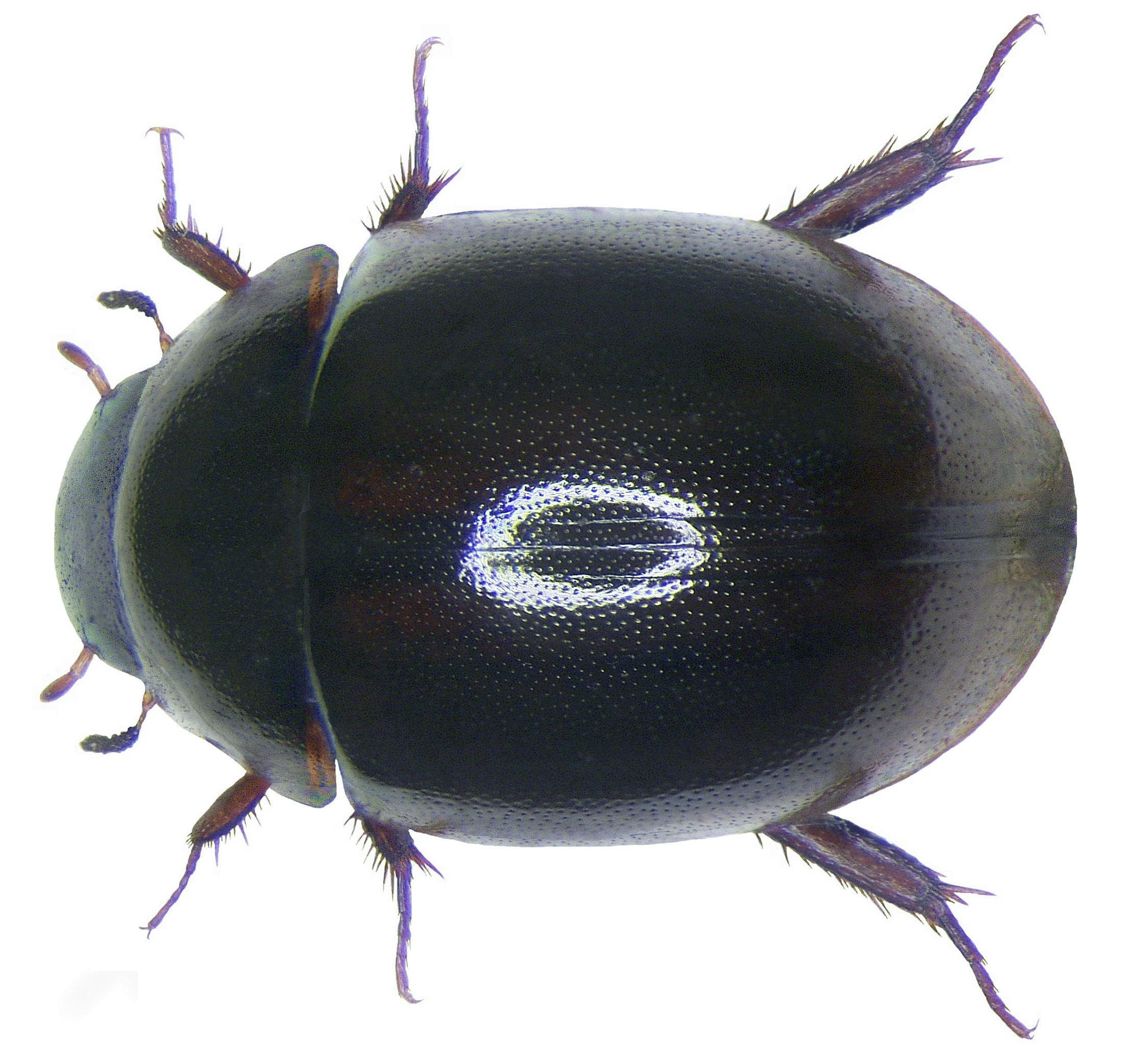
- Anacaena globulus

Scientific classification
- Domain: Eukaryota
- Kingdom: Animalia
- Phylum: Arthropoda
- Class: Insecta
- Order: Coleoptera
- Suborder: Polyphaga
- Infraorder: Staphyliniformia
- Family: Hydrophilidae
- Tribe: Anacaenini
- Genus: Anacaena; C.G. Thomson, 1859

Synonyms
- Creniphilus Motschulsky, 1845; Crenitulus Winters, 1926; Crenophilus Agassiz, 1847; Crenyphilus Motschulsky, 1845; Cryniphilus Motschoulsky, 1845; Enigmata Hansen, 1999; Gentilina Hebauer, 2003; Grodum Hansen, 1999; Hebauerina Gentili, 2002; Laccobiellus Abeille

= Anacaena =

Anacaena Temporal range: 20.44–0 Ma

Genus of water scavenger beetles

Anacaena is a genus of water scavenger beetles in the subfamily Hydrophilinae. It is an extant genus but there is at least one fossil species.

== Species ==
These species belong to the genus Anacaena. More than 100 species are included in this genus worldwide.

- Anacaena angatbuhay (Sanchez, Delocado & Freitag, 2022)^{i c g}
- Anacaena auxilium (Sanchez, Delocado & Freitag, 2022)^{i c g}
- Anacaena bipustulata (Marsham, 1802)^{i c g}
- Anacaena conglobata (Wollaston, 1854)^{g}
- Anacaena debilis (Sharp, 1882)^{i c g}
- Anacaena gaetanae Bameul, 2001^{g}
- Anacaena globulus (Paykull, 1798)^{i c g}
- Anacaena haemorrhoa (Wollaston, 1864)^{g}
- Anacaena jengi Komarek, 2011^{g}
- Anacaena limbata (Fabricius, 1792)^{i c g b}
- Anacaena lohsei Berge Henegouwen & Hebauer, 1989^{g}
- Anacaena lutescens (Stephens, 1829)^{i c g b}
- Anacaena marchantiae (Wollaston, 1857)^{g}
- †Anacaena paleodominica
- Anacaena parvula (Sharp, 1882)^{i c g}
- Anacaena perpenna Orchymont, 1942^{i c g}
- Anacaena rufipes (Guillebeau, 1896)^{g}
- Anacaena signaticollis Fall, 1924^{i c g b}
- Anacaena smetanai Komarek, 2011^{g}
- Anacaena sternalis Leech, 1948^{i c g}
- Anacaena suturalis (LeConte, 1866)^{i c g}
- Anacaena taurica Ryndevich, 2000^{g}

Data sources: i = ITIS, c = Catalogue of Life, g = GBIF, b = Bugguide.net
