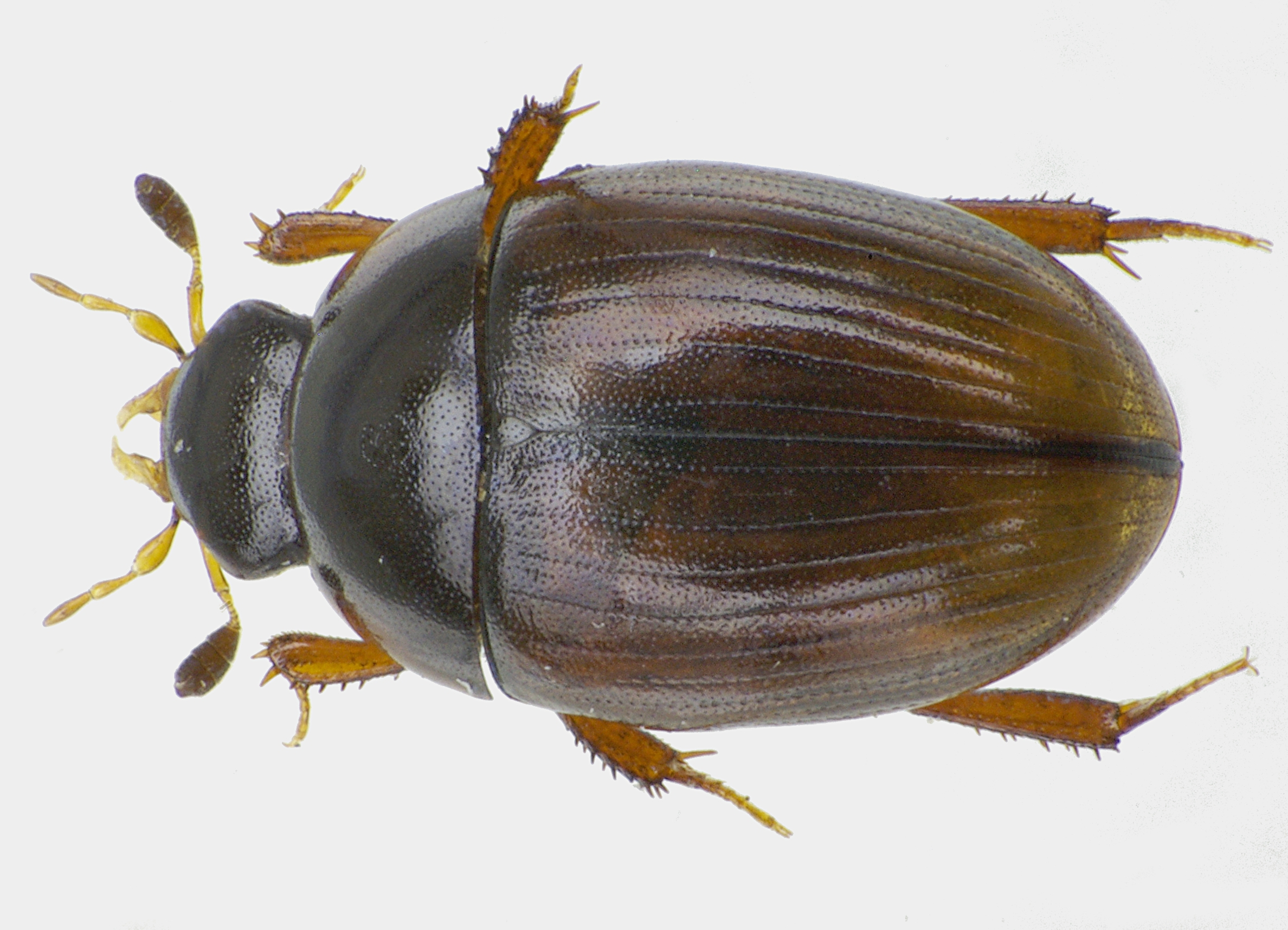
- Cercyon lateralis

Scientific classification
- Domain: Eukaryota
- Kingdom: Animalia
- Phylum: Arthropoda
- Class: Insecta
- Order: Coleoptera
- Suborder: Polyphaga
- Infraorder: Staphyliniformia
- Family: Hydrophilidae
- Tribe: Megasternini
- Genus: Cercyon; Leach, 1817

= Cercyon (beetle) =

Genus of beetles

Cercyon is a genus of water scavenger beetles in the family Hydrophilidae. There are at least 50 described species in Cercyon.

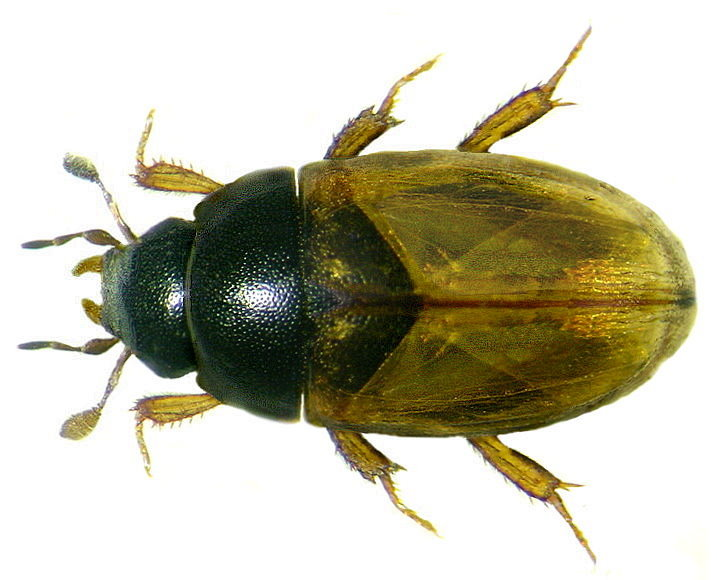
Cercyon quisquilius

== Species ==
These species belong to the genus Cercyon.

- Cercyon adumbratus Mannerheim, 1843
- Cercyon aequatus Knisch, 1924
- Cercyon analis (Paykull, 1798)
- Cercyon arizonicus Dajoz, 1997
- Cercyon assecla Smetana, 1978
- Cercyon cinctus Smetana, 1978
- Cercyon connivens Fall, 1924
- Cercyon convexiusculus Stephens, 1829
- Cercyon crocatus Smetana, 1978
- Cercyon depressus Stephens, 1829
- Cercyon erraticus Smetana, 1978
- Cercyon fimbriatus Mannerheim, 1852
- Cercyon floridanus Horn, 1890
- Cercyon granarius Erichson, 1837
- Cercyon haemorrhoidalis (Fabricius, 1775)
- Cercyon herceus Smetana, 1978
- Cercyon impressus (Sturm, 1807)
- Cercyon indistinctus Horn, 1890
- Cercyon integer Sharp, 1882
- Cercyon kulzeri Knisch, 1922
- Cercyon laminatus Sharp, 1873
- Cercyon lateralis (Marsham, 1802)
- Cercyon limbatus Mannerheim, 1843
- Cercyon lineolatus (Motschulsky, 1863)
- Cercyon littoralis (Gyllenhal, 1808)
- Cercyon luniger Mannerheim, 1853
- Cercyon marinus Thomson, 1853
- Cercyon matthewsi Smetana, 1978
- Cercyon melanocephalus (Linnaeus, 1758)
- Cercyon mellipes (Say, 1835)
- Cercyon mendax Smetana, 1978
- Cercyon mexicanus Sharp, 1882
- Cercyon miniusculus Melsheimer, 1846
- Cercyon minusculus
- Cercyon nevadanus Knisch, 1924
- Cercyon nigriceps (Marsham, 1802)
- Cercyon ocallatus (Say, 1825)
- Cercyon occallatus
- Cercyon pohli Fikáček, 2023
- Cercyon praetextatus (Say, 1825)
- Cercyon pubescens (LeConte, 1855)
- Cercyon pygmaeus (Illiger, 1801)
- Cercyon quisquilius (Linnaeus, 1761)
- Cercyon roseni Knisch, 1922
- Cercyon spathifer Smetana, 1978
- Cercyon terminatus (Marsham, 1802)
- Cercyon tolfino Hatch, 1965
- Cercyon tristis (Illiger, 1801)
- Cercyon unipunctatus (Linnaeus, 1758)
- Cercyon ustulatus (Preyssler, 1790)
- Cercyon variegatus Sharp, 1882
- Cercyon versicolor Smetana, 1978
