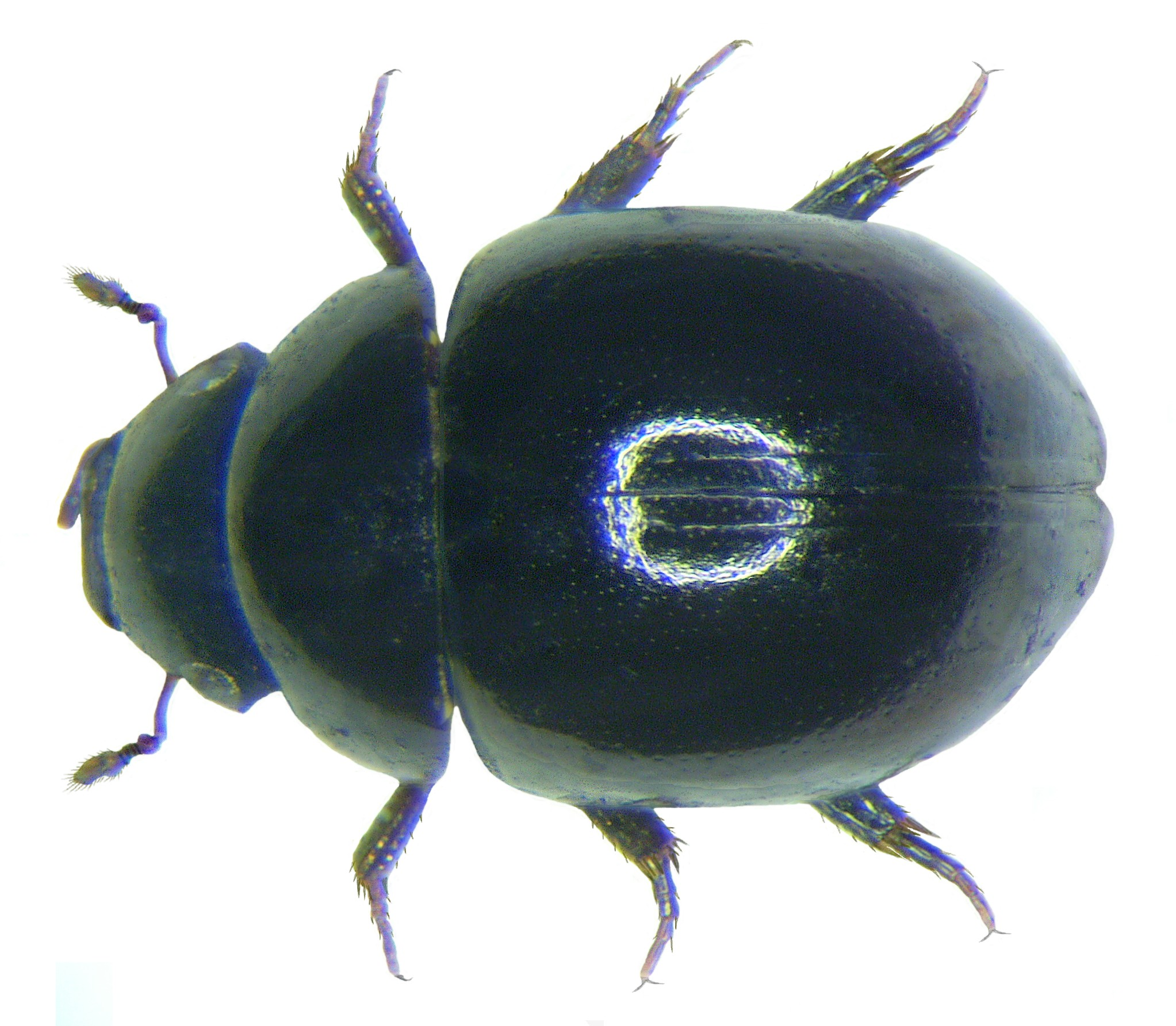
- Chaetarthria seminulum

Scientific classification
- Domain: Eukaryota
- Kingdom: Animalia
- Phylum: Arthropoda
- Class: Insecta
- Order: Coleoptera
- Suborder: Polyphaga
- Infraorder: Staphyliniformia
- Family: Hydrophilidae
- Subfamily: Hydrophilinae
- Genus: Chaetarthria; Stephens, 1833

Synonyms
- Cyllidium Erichson, 1837

= Chaetarthria =

Genus of beetles

Chaetarthria is a genus of water scavenger beetles in the family Hydrophilidae. There are more than 20 described species in Chaetarthria.

== Species ==
These 27 species belong to the genus Chaetarthria:

- Chaetarthria andrea Spangler
- Chaetarthria atra (LeConte, 1863)
- Chaetarthria atroides Miller, 1974
- Chaetarthria ayacuchana Spangler
- Chaetarthria bicolor Sharp, 1882
- Chaetarthria brasilia Miller
- Chaetarthria coheni Spangler
- Chaetarthria gavilana Spangler
- Chaetarthria glabra Sharp, 1882
- Chaetarthria hespera Miller, 1974
- Chaetarthria incisa Fikáek, 2010
- Chaetarthria laeticula Sharp, 1882
- Chaetarthria leechi Miller, 1974
- Chaetarthria magna Miller, 1974
- Chaetarthria milleri Spangler
- Chaetarthria nigrella (LeConte, 1861)
- Chaetarthria ochra Miller, 1974
- Chaetarthria pallida (LeConte, 1861)
- Chaetarthria porknockeri Spangler
- Chaetarthria punctulata Sharp, 1882
- Chaetarthria pusilla Sharp, 1882
- Chaetarthria seminulum (Herbst, 1797)
- Chaetarthria spangleri Miller
- Chaetarthria spinata Miller, 1974
- Chaetarthria truncata Miller, 1974
- Chaetarthria utahensis Miller, 1974
- Chaetarthria veracruzensis Miller
