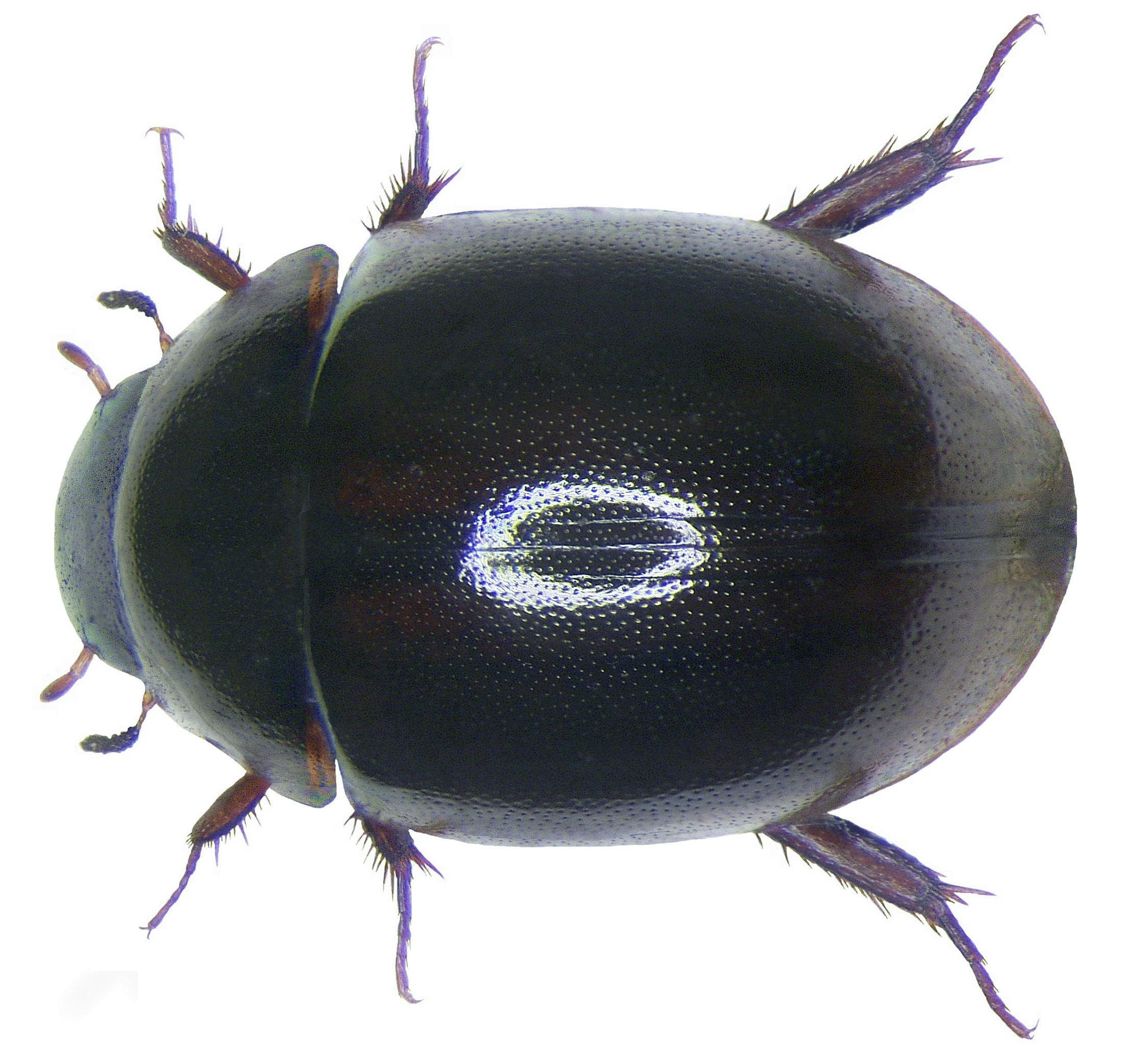
- Anacaena globulus

Scientific classification
- Domain: Eukaryota
- Kingdom: Animalia
- Phylum: Arthropoda
- Class: Insecta
- Order: Coleoptera
- Suborder: Polyphaga
- Infraorder: Staphyliniformia
- Family: Hydrophilidae
- Subfamily: Hydrophilinae
- Tribe: Anacaenini; Thomson, 1859

= Anacaenini =

Tribe of beetles

Anacaenini is a tribe in the subfamily Hydrophilinae of aquatic beetles, and it contains 256 species in 6 genera.

== Genera ==
- Anacaena
- Crenitis
- Notohydrus
- Notionotus
- Paracymus
- Phelea
