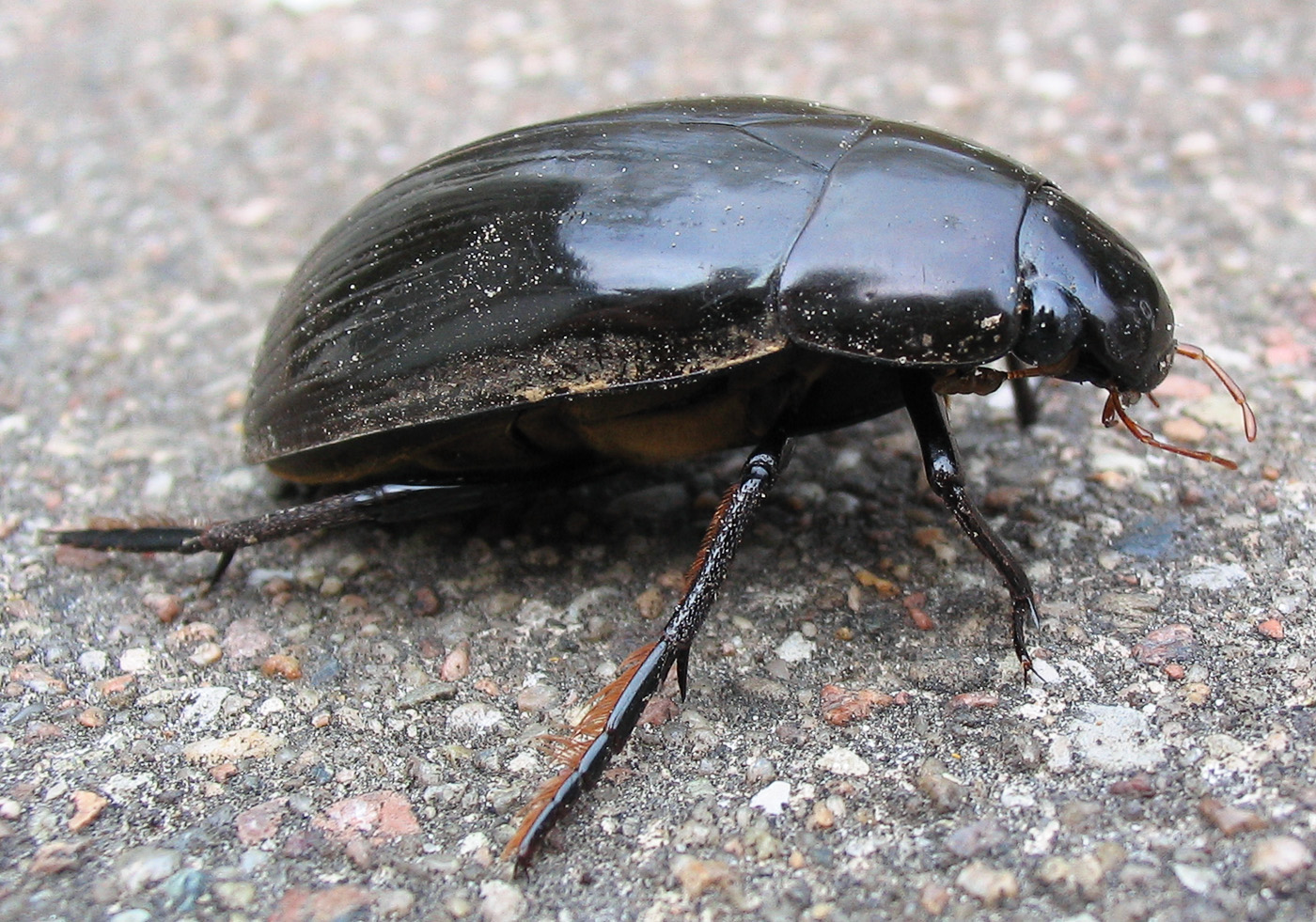
- Hydrophilus piceus

Scientific classification
- Kingdom: Animalia
- Phylum: Arthropoda
- Clade: Pancrustacea
- Class: Insecta
- Order: Coleoptera
- Suborder: Polyphaga
- Infraorder: Staphyliniformia
- Superfamily: Hydrophiloidea
- Family: Hydrophilidae; Latreille, 1802

Genera
- 169

= Hydrophilidae =

Hydrophilidae Temporal range: Late Jurassic–Recent

Family of beetles

Hydrophilidae, also known colloquially as water scavenger beetles, is a family of beetles. Aquatic hydrophilids are notable for their long maxillary palps, which are longer than their antennae. Several of the former subfamilies of Hydrophilidae have recently been removed and elevated to family rank; Epimetopidae, Georissidae (= Georyssidae), Helophoridae, Hydrochidae, and Spercheidae. While the majority of hydrophilids are aquatic, around a third of described species are terrestrial, mostly belonging to the subfamily Sphaeridiinae.

With rare exceptions, the larvae are predatory while the adults may be herbivores or predators in addition to scavenging. Many species are able to produce sounds.

Species of Hydrophilus are reported as pests in fish hatcheries. Other species are voracious consumers of mosquito larvae, and have potential as biological control agents.

This beetle family contains 2,835 species in 169 genera.

== Geography ==
Hydrophilid beetles are found worldwide. In the Americas, they are usually found in areas of high humidity such as the tropics of Central and South America. They can also be found in rain pools and ponds in the forests of Guatemala and Argentina. They also tend to exist in North America in areas with seasonal wetlands or lakes depending on the state. Hydrophilus triangularis is found widely throughout the United States and is the biggest water beetle in the country. The family Hydrophilidae has been reported in every state in the United States.

== Evolutionary history ==
The oldest known fossils definitively assignable to the family are from the Late Jurassic Solnhofen of Germany and Talbragar Fish Bed in Australia.

== Habitat ==
A majority of the beetles in the family Hydrophilidae live in aquatic environments in both their larval and adult life stages. Some hydrophilid beetles will lay their eggs in ephemeral ponds and puddles where the larvae will live as they develop. Other beetles such as Derralus angustus and Tropisternus setiger live in permanent ponds. Some beetles such as Tropisternus lateralis will only live in aquatic environments that lack fish because fish prey on their eggs, while others like D. angustus prefer aquatic habitats with a specific species of floating fern. Generally, hydrophilids live in marshy, shallow, and heavily weeded aquatic environments. There are some hydrophilid beetles that make their homes in fresh animal waste, decaying vegetation, or humus-rich soil. They survive in a very wide variety of locations and because of that some types are more adapted to specific environments than others and will often only move to habitats of the same type.

== Physiology ==
Reproduction in hydrophilids takes place in bodies of water such as ponds. In the larval stage the beetle resides in a shallow area of the pond because they are dependent on the oxygen only available in the shallower areas. After the beetle exits the pupa stage they often take flight and move to a new area before they reproduce. Wing growth depends on the environment that the beetle resides in. Beetles in lentic habitats have better wing development compared to lotic habitats because lentic habitats are less reliable and require the beetles to disperse quicker in order to survive. Some beetles such as Berosus larvae can inhabit areas deeper in the water due to their thoracic gills while others like Berosus ingeminatus use cutaneous respiration allowing them to hold air for longer periods of time. The ability to consume oxygen at deeper water levels helps them avoid being preyed upon from surface predators. Larvae use two main types of feeding mechanism, chewing and piercing-sucking, with the latter evolving at least three times independently in Hydrophilidae and once in Epimetopidae and allowing underwater extra-oral digestion, decreasing dependence on aerial environments. Adult hydrophilid beetles can survive in deeper areas of water and stay under for longer due to their special abilities in acquiring oxygen. They can hold air bubbles under their elytra that connect to their spiracles for them to use the trapped oxygen. They also have many fine hairs along their bodies that can trap oxygen. They can pull oxygen from the water into these areas on their body so that they can avoid returning to the surface for long periods of time. They only return to the surface when they need to replace the air they have acquired.

== Reproduction ==
Some species of hydrophilid beetles in the genus Tropisternus have complex methods of signaling and communication including chirps, clicks, buzzing, and various body postures. These behaviors can assist in courtship. Courtship behaviors have been observed in Tropisternus ellipticus in which the females produced audible buzzing and shaking to rebuff potential suitors. In response to the rejection maneuvers of the female, male T. ellipticus will mimic the buzzing and shaking, often learning from repeated encounters of this kind to avoid females that produce these behaviors. Males may remember these encounters for up to 39 minutes when properly reinforced, which suggests that they have some capability for recording short-term memory. Typical courtship in these beetles consists of the following steps:

1. The male approaches the female, buzzing and swimming around her.
2. If the female is receptive, she will either chirp in response and move toward the male or remain still and silent. No rejection behavior occurs at this time.
3. The male approaches further and mounts the female.
4. The male will touch his maxillary palps to that of the female while producing a buzzing sound.
5. If the female does not rebuff his advances, the male with move to the back and probe the abdomen of the female with his aedeagus.
6. If she is receptive, the female must lower her abdomen for the male to penetrate.

Males mount other beetles indiscriminately, and homosexual copulation has been known to occur.

Anacaena lutescens, a species of hydrophilid beetle, has been observed as reproducing via parthenogenesis. Reproduction by parthenogenesis is relatively uncommon in other types of insects.

== Life stages ==
In Enochrus quadripunctatus, a species of hydrophilid beetle, it takes an average of 43 days for a newly hatched larva to reach its adult form. Juvenile mortality is high in this species, decreasing with each successive instar.

Females will bury their silken egg case in the damp soil near a stream. Typically, the female will only create and lay one egg case per day, though they may create up to 20 egg cases in the weeks following a mating event and each case may produce from 1–32 individual larva. Females who have not mated will still create egg cases, but they will typically be empty or will not hatch at all. Not all egg cases laid by a mated female will hatch and produce viable offspring, but 42–70% will. Larval forms are carnivorous and may exhibit cannibalism among the individuals in a single egg case before hatching. The eggs begin to hatch an average of eight days after being laid. The egg hatches by way of the larvae eating their way out of the casing, usually by way of the lid. This process can take several days in some instances. Once the egg hatches, the first instar larvae will disperse, but will continue to feed on one another if the opportunity presents itself. They will remain in the first instar form for an average of 9.5 days before progressing to the second instar. Second instar individuals are much more robust, and voraciously feed on what meat they can find. They are strong swimmers at this stage and can be found at or beneath the surface of the stream. After an average of 11 days, they will transition to their third instar form. The third instar will last an average of 8.4 days, during which the larvae will continue feeding and become progressively slower as they reach their pupation stage. When they are ready to pupate, the larva will burrow into the sand where they will remain for 14 days before emerging as an adult. After vacating their burrow, the new adult will stand on the sand for up to 24 hours to allow its carapace to harden. Once fully hardened, the new fully grown adult beetle will travel to the water to hunt, where it will remain for the rest of its life.

Although individuals of each species of hydrophilid (even those within the same genus) may vary in the duration of each of these life stages, mortality rates at each stage, and the number of offspring produced, few studies have been done to this effect on other species of hydrophilid.

== Diet ==
Larval hydrophilids are predatory by nature and different species have different food consumption habits. The larvae usually ingest small invertebrates and snails but have been known to also eat small fish and tadpoles. Berosus ingeminatus prey mostly on Cricotopus sylvestris and other types of midges while Tropisternus setiger are tactile hunters and will eat whatever prey comes their way; they may even abandon a meal for a new one if the opportunity arises. The predatory habits of this species are often left behind in the larval stage. Generally adult hydrophilids feed on various vegetation, alive or decaying, and will occasionally eat dead animal tissue.

== Predators ==
Hydrophilids have many predators from a range of different species. Fish, birds, predaceous insects, and turtles are the main predators in their aquatic environments. Humans have also been known to eat hydrophilid beetles.

== Behavior ==
=== Acoustic behavior ===
Member of the genus Tropisternus have been shown to perform acoustic sounds in their communicative behavior. Specific calls include stress calls, a male courtship call, a male copulating sound, and a female rejection buzz. The sound production comes from the friction created by the beetle rubbing its spectrum (a well- defined ridge or lip) to its finely ridged surface called a pars stridens on the beetle's underside.

=== Predatory behavior ===
Larval hydrophilids hunt a wide variety of prey such as copepods, mosquito larvae, snails, and conspecifics. The larvae have a unique way of hunting by lifting their prey out of the water to consume it. The reason for this is not well known, but there is a suggestion that lifting the prey makes it more difficult for the prey to escape. In addition to lifting their prey out of the water, hydrophilid larvae choose specific vegetation to wait in so that they may ambush their prey. In addition, the larvae often change ambush sites according to prey density. The frequency is directly correlated to the amount of prey in the ambush areas and specific attack sites.

== Subfamilies ==
The classification to subfamilies and tribes was revised by Short and Fikáček in 2013:

- Acidocerinae (revised by Girón and Short)
- Chaetarthriinae
- Cylominae (as Rygmodinae in; see)
- Enochrinae
- Hydrophilinae
- Sphaeridiinae

== See also ==
- Hydrochara caraboides

== Bibliography ==
- Short, A. E. Z. Fikáček, M. 2011: World catalogue of the Hydrophiloidea (Coleoptera): additions and corrections II (2006–2010). Acta Entomologica Musei Nationalis Pragae, 51(1): 83–122. PDF
