= A. latus =

A. latus may refer to:

- Abacetus latus, a ground beetle
- Acanthopagrus latus, a marine fish found in the Western Pacific Ocean
- Aepycamelus latus, a prehistoric mammal
- Alcaligenes latus, a synonym of Azohydromonas lata, a bacterium
- Ametor latus, a water scavenger beetle found in North America
- Amphicoelias latus, a synonym of either Camarasaurus supremus or Camarasaurus grandis, prehistoric dinosaurs
- Anancylus latus, a longhorn beetle found in Papua New Guinea and Indonesia
- Anasimus latus, a crab found on coasts of the Western Atlantic Ocean
- Anisopodus latus, a longhorn beetle
- Aspergillus latus, a fungus
- Atypichthys latus, a fish found in Australia and New Zealand
- Aulotrachichthys latus, the Philippine luminous roughy, a slimehead fish found in the Western Pacific Ocean
