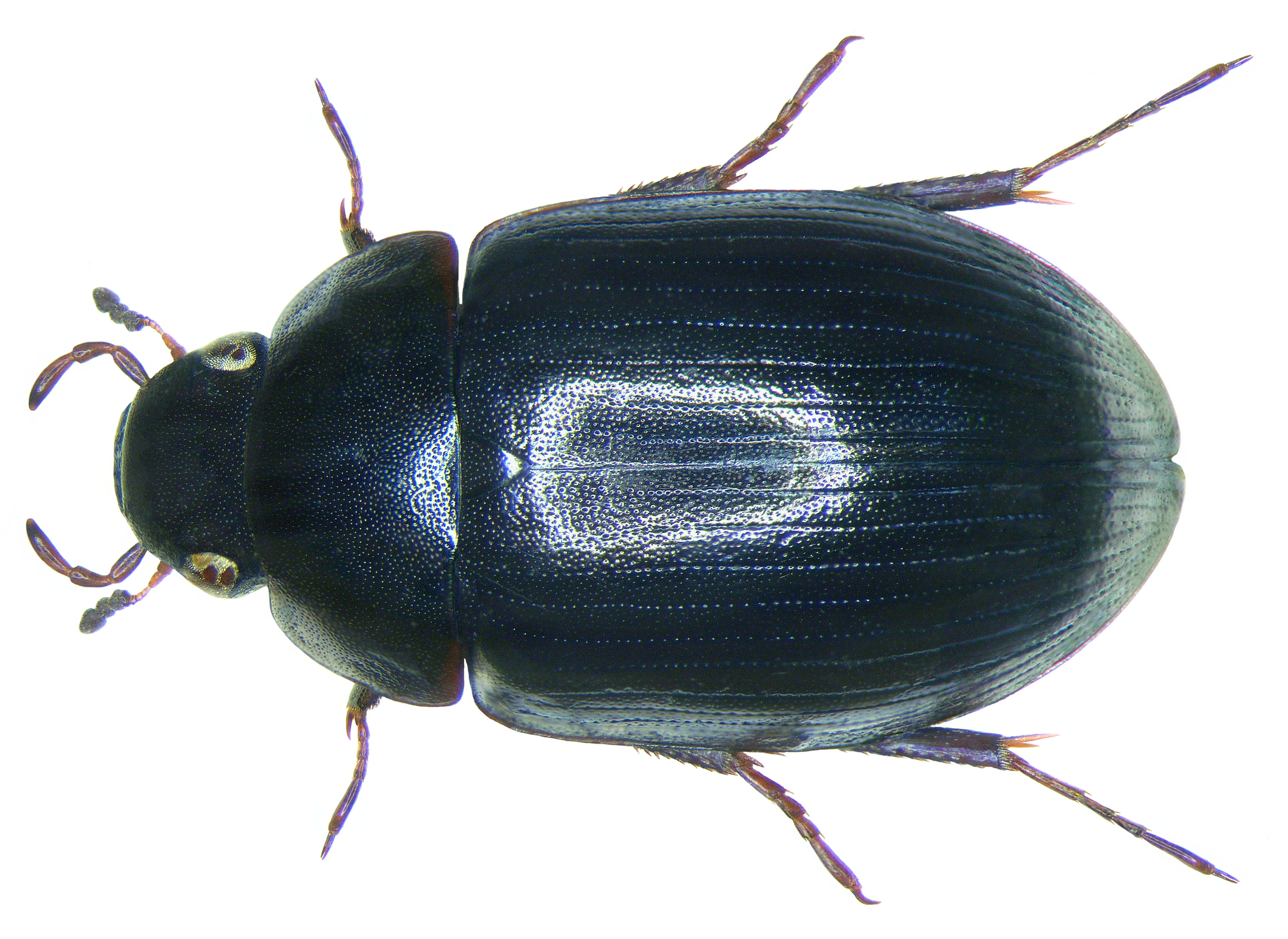
- Hydrobius fuscipes

Scientific classification
- Kingdom: Animalia
- Phylum: Arthropoda
- Clade: Pancrustacea
- Class: Insecta
- Order: Coleoptera
- Suborder: Polyphaga
- Infraorder: Staphyliniformia
- Family: Hydrophilidae
- Subfamily: Hydrophilinae
- Tribe: Hydrobiusini; Mulsant, 1844

= Hydrobiusini =

Tribe of beetles

Hydrobiusini is a tribe in the subfamily Hydrophilinae of aquatic beetles, and containing 47 species in 9 genera.

== Genera ==
- Ametor
- Hybogralius
- Hydramara
- Hydrobius
- Hydrocassis
- Limnocyclus
- Limnohydrobius
- Limnoxenus
- Sperchopsis
