= Pelthydrus =

Scientific classification
- Kingdom: Animalia
- Phylum: Arthropoda
- Class: Insecta
- Order: Coleoptera
- Suborder: Polyphaga
- Infraorder: Staphyliniformia
- Family: Hydrophilidae
- Subfamily: Hydrophilinae
- Tribe: Laccobiini
- Genus: Pelthydrus; D'Orchymont, 1919

Diversity
- About 65 species

Synonyms
- Globipelthydrus Schonmann, 1994

Genus of beetles

Pelthydrus is a genus of beetles belonging to the family Hydrophilidae. The genus has primarily Oriental origin and has 65 described species.

== Species ==
- Pelthydrus acutus Schönmann, 1994
- Pelthydrus angulatus Bian, Schönmann & L.Ji, 2008
- Pelthydrus balinensis Schönmann, 1994
- Pelthydrus boholensis Schönmann, 1994
- Pelthydrus borneensis Schönmann, 1994
- Pelthydrus boukali Schönmann, 1995
- Pelthydrus brouni Orchymont, 1919
- Pelthydrus championi Orchymont, 1926
- Pelthydrus corporaali Orchymont, 1923
- Pelthydrus dudgeoni Schönmann, 1994
- Pelthydrus elongatulus Schönmann, 1995
- Pelthydrus excisus Schönmann, 1994
- Pelthydrus fenestratus Schönmann, 1995
- Pelthydrus feuerborni Orchymont, 1932
- Pelthydrus globosus Schönmann, 1994
- Pelthydrus grossus Bian, Dongju, Schönmann & Lanzhu Ji, 2009
- Pelthydrus hendrichi Schönmann, 1995
- Pelthydrus horaki Schönmann, 1994
- Pelthydrus hortensis Schönmann, 1995
- Pelthydrus inaspectus Orchymont, 1926
- Pelthydrus incognitus Schönmann, 1995
- Pelthydrus indicus Schönmann, 1995
- Pelthydrus iniquus Schönmann, 1995
- Pelthydrus insularis Schönmann, 1995
- Pelthydrus jaechi Schönmann, 1994
- Pelthydrus jaechorum Schönmann, 1995
- Pelthydrus japonicus Satô, 1960
- Pelthydrus jendeki Schönmann, 1994
- Pelthydrus jengi Schönmann, 1995
- Pelthydrus kapitensis Schönmann, 1995
- Pelthydrus kelabitensis Schönmann, 1994
- Pelthydrus kodadai Schönmann, 1994
- Pelthydrus longifolius Bian, Dongju, Schönmann & Lanzhu Ji, 2009
- Pelthydrus madli Schönmann, 1995
- Pelthydrus microreticulatus Schönmann, 1995
- Pelthydrus minutus Orchymont, 1919
- Pelthydrus natifer Schönmann, 1995
- Pelthydrus nepalensis Schönmann, 1995
- Pelthydrus okinawanus Nakane, 1982
- Pelthydrus ovalis Orchymont, 1932
- Pelthydrus philippinensis Schönmann, 1995
- Pelthydrus posterioinsectus Schönmann, 1994
- Pelthydrus rosa Bian, Dongju, Schönmann & Lanzhu Ji, 2009
- Pelthydrus rugosiceps Schönmann, 1995
- Pelthydrus ruiliensis Zhu, Bingyue, Lanzhu Ji & Dongju Bian, 2018
- Pelthydrus sarawacensis Schönmann, 1995
- Pelthydrus schillhammeri Schönmann, 1995
- Pelthydrus schoedli Schönmann, 1994
- Pelthydrus schoenmanni Zhu, Ji & Bian, 2019
- Pelthydrus sculpturatus Orchymont, 1919
- Pelthydrus siamensis Schönmann, 1995
- Pelthydrus similis Orchymont, 1937
- Pelthydrus speculifer Schönmann, 1995
- Pelthydrus subgrossus Bian, Dongju, Schönmann & Lanzhu Ji, 2009
- Pelthydrus suffarcinatus Schönmann, 1995
- Pelthydrus thienemanni Orchymont, 1932
- Pelthydrus tongi Bian, Schönmann & L.Ji, 2008
- Pelthydrus truncatus Orchymont, 1932
- Pelthydrus venatorcapitis Schönmann, 1994
- Pelthydrus ventricarinatus Schönmann, 1995
- Pelthydrus vietnamensis Schönmann, 1994
- Pelthydrus vitalisi Orchymont, 1926
- Pelthydrus waltraudae Bian, Schönmann & L.Ji, 2008
- Pelthydrus yulinensis Bian, Dongju, Schönmann & Lanzhu Ji, 2009
- Pelthydrus zetteli Schönmann, 1995
