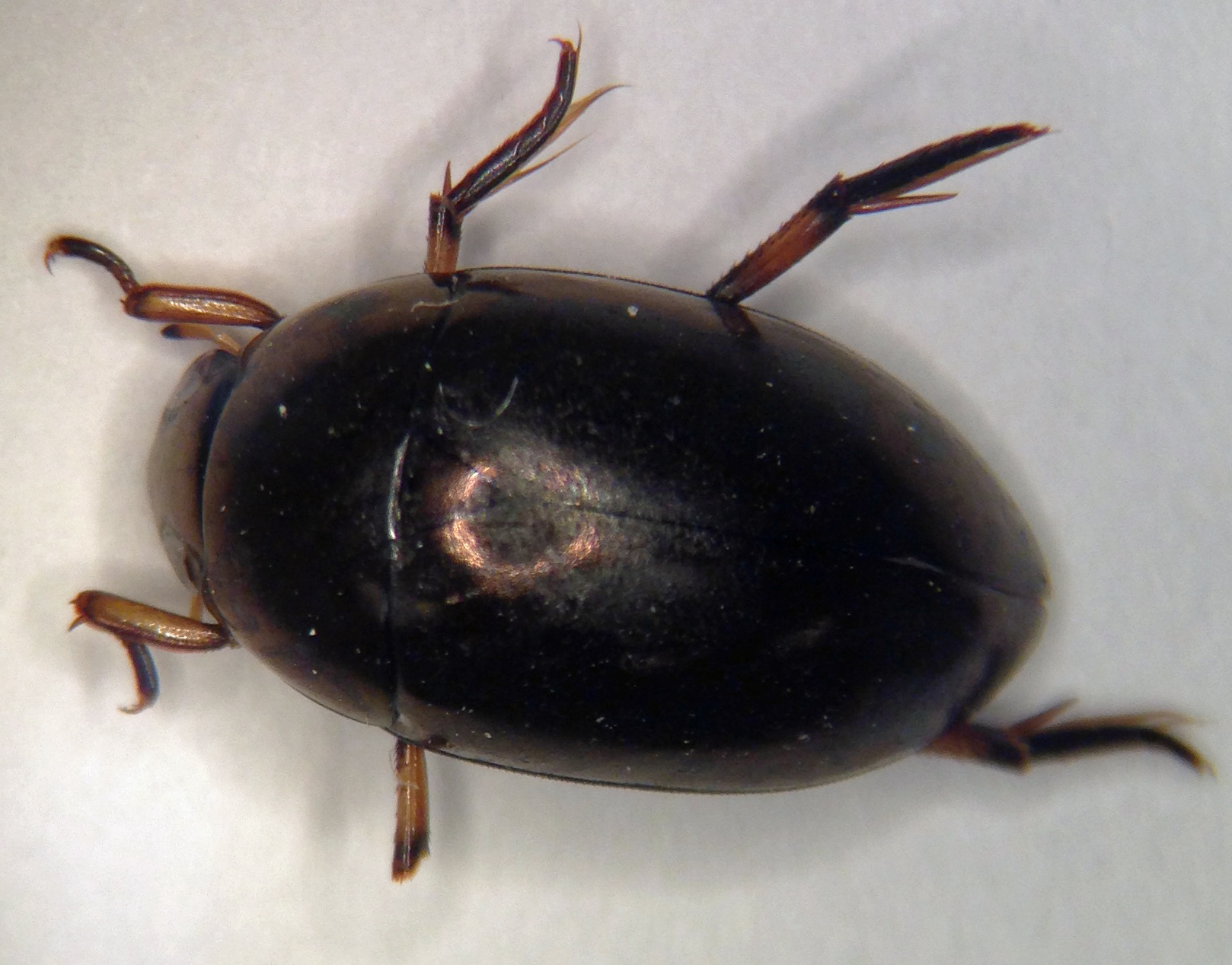

Scientific classification
- Kingdom: Animalia
- Phylum: Arthropoda
- Class: Insecta
- Order: Coleoptera
- Suborder: Polyphaga
- Infraorder: Staphyliniformia
- Family: Hydrophilidae
- Genus: Tropisternus
- Species: T. blatchleyi

Binomial name
- Tropisternus blatchleyi Orchymont, 1922

= Tropisternus blatchleyi =

Species of beetle

Tropisternus blatchleyi is a species of water scavenger beetle in the family Hydrophilidae. It is found in North America.

== Subspecies ==
These two subspecies belong to the species Tropisternus blatchleyi:

- Tropisternus blatchleyi blatchleyi Orchymont, 1922
- Tropisternus blatchleyi modestus Orchymont, 1938
