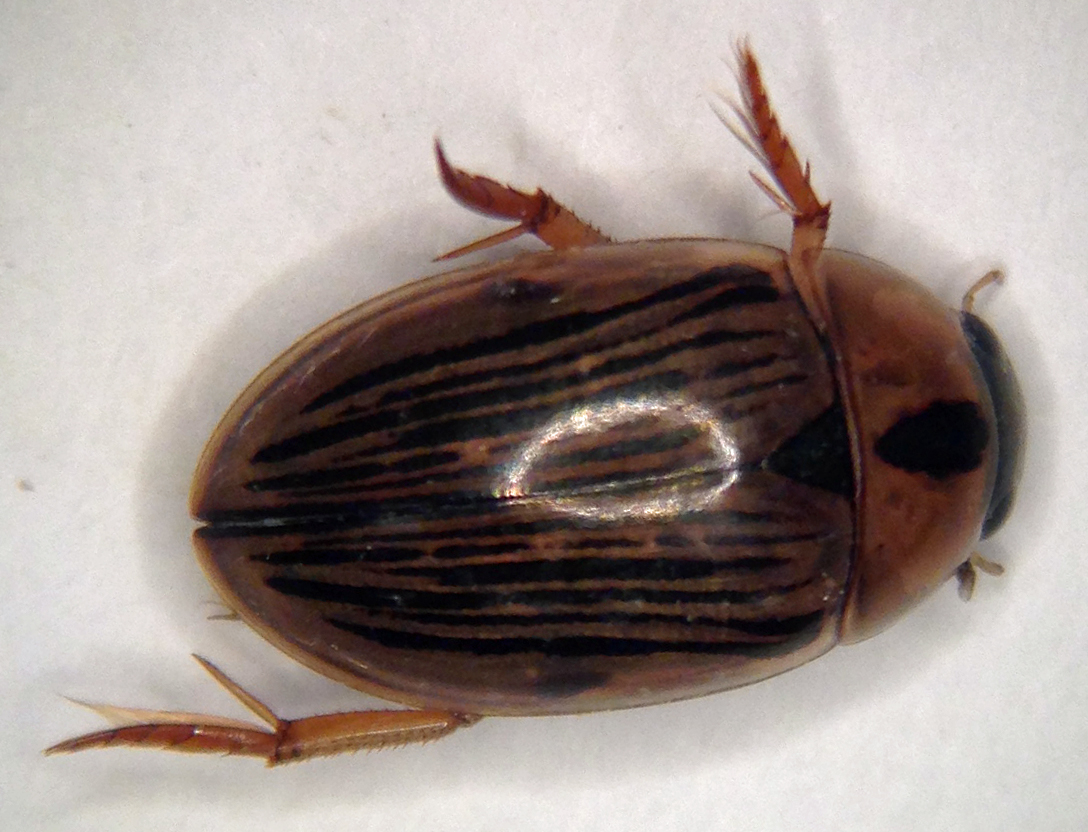
- Tropisternus collaris

Scientific classification
- Kingdom: Animalia
- Phylum: Arthropoda
- Class: Insecta
- Order: Coleoptera
- Suborder: Polyphaga
- Infraorder: Staphyliniformia
- Family: Hydrophilidae
- Subfamily: Hydrophilinae
- Tribe: Hydrophilini
- Genus: Tropisternus; Solier, 1834

Synonyms
- Cyphostethus Orchymont, 1919

= Tropisternus =

Genus of beetles

Tropisternus is a genus of hydrophilid beetles with 63 species in five subgenera in North and South America.

== Species ==
- Subgenus Homostethus
  - Tropisternus cordieri Orchymont, 1922
  - Tropisternus falli Orchymont, 1922
  - Tropisternus metallescens Orchymont, 1922
- Subgenus Pleurhomus
  - Tropisternus sahlbergi (Sharp, 1883)
- Subgenus Pristoternus
  - Tropisternus acaragua Bachmann, 1970
  - Tropisternus apicipalpis (Chevrolat, 1834)
  - Tropisternus azurescens Orchymont, 1921
  - Tropisternus baeri Orchymont, 1921
  - Tropisternus breviceps Sharp, 1883
  - Tropisternus brevicollis Sharp, 1882
  - Tropisternus bruchi Orchymont, 1921
  - Tropisternus chalybeus Castelnau, 1840
  - Tropisternus chontalensis Sharp, 1882
  - Tropisternus crassus Sharp, 1882
  - Tropisternus dilatatus Bruch, 1915
  - Tropisternus ebenus (Klug, 1829)
  - Tropisternus flavipalpis Sharp, 1883
  - Tropisternus gaeae Bachmann, 1969
  - Tropisternus laevis (Sturm, 1826)
  - Tropisternus latus (Brullé, 1837)
  - Tropisternus mergus Say, 1835
  - Tropisternus missionum Fernández & Bachmann, 2000
  - Tropisternus mutatus Orchymont, 1921
  - Tropisternus noa Fernández & Bachmann, 2000
  - Tropisternus obesus Bruch, 1915
  - Tropisternus oculatus Sharp, 1882
  - Tropisternus ovalis Castelnau, 1840
  - Tropisternus paredesi Leech, 1943
  - Tropisternus phyllisae Spangler & Short, 2008
  - Tropisternus regimbarti Orchymont, 1921
  - Tropisternus robustus Sharp, 1883
  - Tropisternus sanapana Bachmann, 1970
  - Tropisternus variolosus Hansen, 1999
- Subgenus Strepitornus
  - Tropisternus collaris (Fabricius, 1775)
  - Tropisternus niger Orchymont, 1938
  - Tropisternus parananus Sharp, 1883
- Subgenus Tropisternus
  - Tropisternus affinis Motschulsky, 1859
  - Tropisternus blatchleyi Orchymont, 1922
  - Tropisternus burmeisteri Fernández & Bachmann, 1980
  - Tropisternus californicus (LeConte, 1855)
  - Tropisternus carinispina Orchymont, 1922
  - Tropisternus columbianus Brown, 1931
  - Tropisternus flavescens Orchymont, 1922
  - Tropisternus fuscitarsis Sharp, 1882
  - Tropisternus glaber (Herbst, 1797)
  - Tropisternus ignoratus Knisch, 1921
  - Tropisternus jolyi Spangler, 1981
  - Tropisternus knischi Orchymont, 1943
  - Tropisternus lancifer Sharp, 1883
  - Tropisternus lateralis (Fabricius, 1775)
  - Tropisternus longispina Fernández & Bachmann, 1980
  - Tropisternus mixtus (LeConte, 1855)
  - Tropisternus natator Orchymont, 1938
  - Tropisternus obscurus Sharp, 1882
  - Tropisternus orvus Leech, 1945
  - Tropisternus quadristriatus (Horn, 1871)
  - Tropisternus richmondi Spangler & Short, 2008
  - Tropisternus salsamentus Fall, 1901
  - Tropisternus setiger (Germar, 1824)
  - Tropisternus sharpi Orchymont, 1922
  - Tropisternus sublaevis (LeConte, 1855)
  - Tropisternus surinamensis Spangler & Short, 2008
  - Tropisternus tinctus Sharp, 1882
