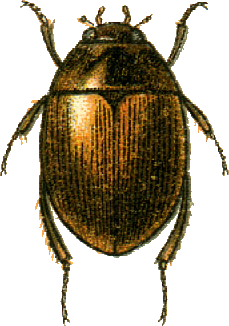
- Laccobius cinereus

Scientific classification
- Kingdom: Animalia
- Phylum: Arthropoda
- Class: Insecta
- Order: Coleoptera
- Suborder: Polyphaga
- Infraorder: Staphyliniformia
- Family: Hydrophilidae
- Subfamily: Hydrophilinae
- Tribe: Laccobiini
- Genus: Laccobius; Erichson, 1837

= Laccobius =

Genus of beetles

Laccobius is a genus of water scavenger beetles in the family Hydrophilidae. There are more than 80 described species in Laccobius.

== Species ==
These 81 species belong to the genus Laccobius:

- Hydroxenus subpictus Wollaston, 1867
- Laccobius agilis (Randall, 1838)
- Laccobius albescens Rottenberg, 1874
- Laccobius algiricus Hansen, 1999
- Laccobius alternus Motschulsky, 1855
- Laccobius antillensis Spangler, 1968
- Laccobius arenarius Cheary, 1971
- Laccobius atricolor d'Orchymont, 1938
- Laccobius atrocephalus Reitter, 1872
- Laccobius bipunctatus (Fabricius, 1775)
- Laccobius borealis Cheary, 1971
- Laccobius bruesi Cheary, 1971
- Laccobius californicus Orchymont, 1942
- Laccobius carri Orchymont, 1942
- Laccobius cinereus Motschulsky, 1860
- Laccobius colon (Stephens, 1829)
- Laccobius curvipes Régimbart, 1903
- Laccobius decorus (Gyllenhal, 1827)
- Laccobius elegans Gentili, 1979
- Laccobius ellipticus LeConte, 1855
- Laccobius elongatus Scudder, 1878
- Laccobius exspectans Gentili
- Laccobius femoralis Rey, 1885
- Laccobius flachii Lomnicki, 1894
- Laccobius flavosplendens Endrödy-Younga, 1967
- Laccobius florens Gentili, 1979
- Laccobius formosus Gentili, 1979
- Laccobius fragilis Nakane, 1966
- Laccobius fuscipunctatus Hilsenhoff, 1995
- Laccobius gloriana Gentili & Ribera, 1998
- Laccobius gracilis Motschulsky, 1855
- Laccobius hainanensis
- Laccobius hammondi Gentili, 1984
- Laccobius hardyi Cheary, 1971
- Laccobius hingstoni Orchymont, 1926
- Laccobius hintoni Orchymont, 1942
- Laccobius hispanicus Gentili, 1974
- Laccobius inopinus Gentili
- Laccobius insolitus Orchymont, 1942
- Laccobius leechi Cheary, 1971
- Laccobius leopardus
- Laccobius leucaspis Kiesenwetter, 1870
- Laccobius manalicus Short & Fikácek, 2011
- Laccobius martini
- Laccobius mexicanus Orchymont, 1942
- Laccobius minutoides Orchymont, 1942
- Laccobius minutus (Linnaeus, 1758)
- Laccobius moraguesi Régimbart, 1898
- Laccobius neapolitanus Rottenberg, 1874
- Laccobius nepalensis Gentili, 1982
- Laccobius nevadensis Miller, 1965
- Laccobius nitidus Gentili, 1984
- Laccobius occidentalis Cheary, 1971
- Laccobius oregonensis Cheary, 1971
- Laccobius orsenigoi Gentili
- Laccobius pallidissimus Reitter, 1899
- Laccobius philipinus Gentili, 2005
- Laccobius piceus Fall, 1922
- Laccobius politus Gentili, 1979
- Laccobius priscus Oustalet, 1870
- Laccobius qinlingensis
- Laccobius quilingensis
- Laccobius reflexipenis Cheary, 1971
- Laccobius revelierei Perris, 1864
- Laccobius sculptus d'Orchymont, 1935
- Laccobius scutellaris Motschulsky, 1855
- Laccobius simulans Orchymont, 1923
- Laccobius simulatrix d'Orchymont, 1932
- Laccobius sinuatus Motschulsky, 1849
- Laccobius spangleri Cheary, 1971
- Laccobius striatulus (Fabricius, 1801)
- Laccobius sublaevis J.Sahlberg, 1900
- Laccobius syriacus Guillebeau, 1896
- Laccobius teneralis Cheary, 1971
- Laccobius thermarius Tournier, 1878
- Laccobius truncatipennis Miller, 1965
- Laccobius uhligi Gentili, 1995
- Laccobius varius Gentili, 1975
- Laccobius vetustus Oustalet, 1874
- Laccobius wewalkai
- Laccobius yinziweii Zhang & Jia, 2017
