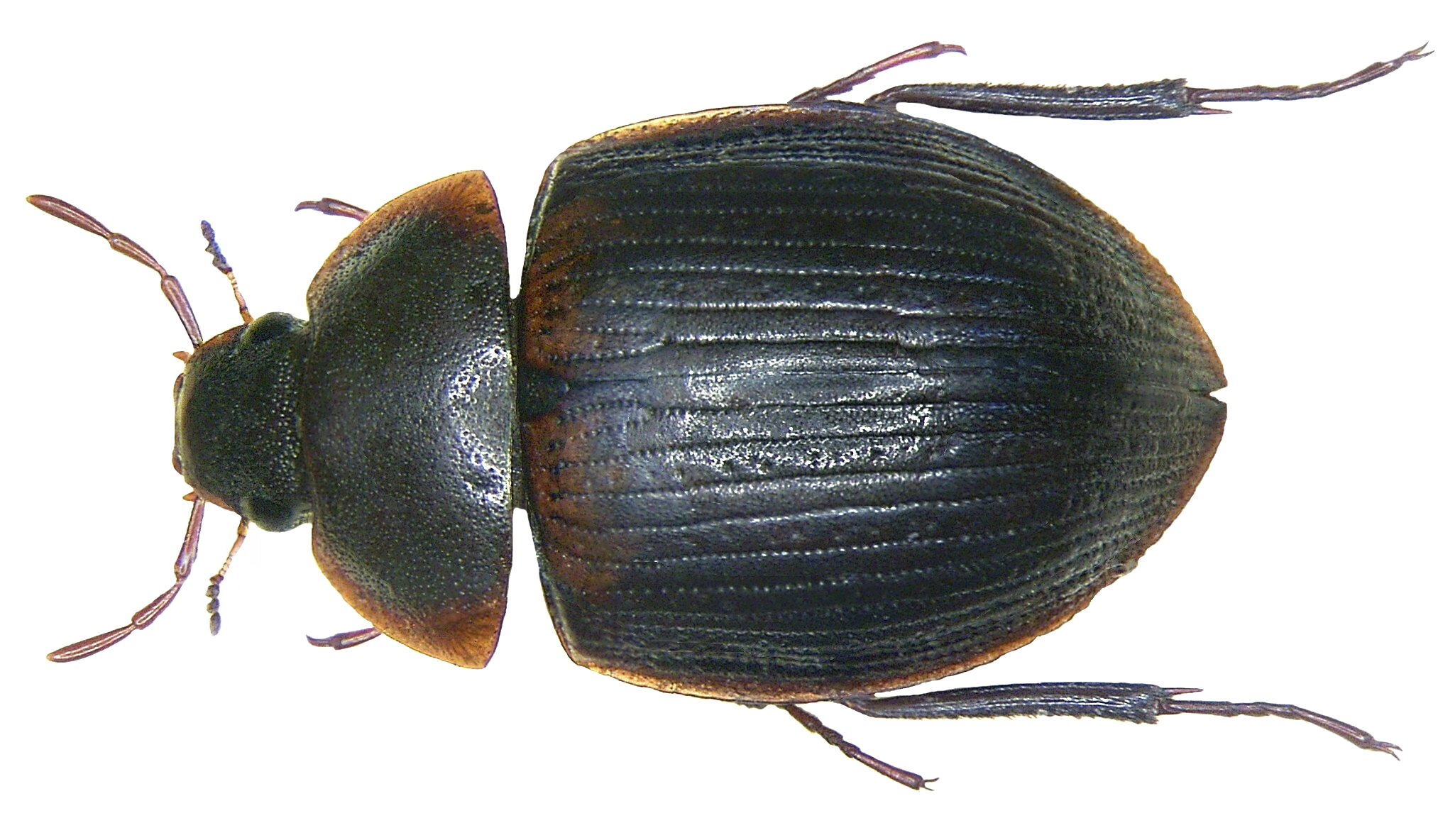
- Hydrocassis scapulata

Scientific classification
- Domain: Eukaryota
- Kingdom: Animalia
- Phylum: Arthropoda
- Class: Insecta
- Order: Coleoptera
- Suborder: Polyphaga
- Infraorder: Staphyliniformia
- Family: Hydrophilidae
- Subfamily: Hydrophilinae
- Tribe: Sperchopsini; Hansen, 1991

= Sperchopsini =

Tribe of beetles

Sperchopsini is a tribe in the subfamily Hydrophilinae of aquatic beetles, and it contains 24 species in 5 genera.

== Genera ==
- Ametor
- Anticura
- Cylomissus
- Hydrocassis
- Sperchopsis
