= Amphiopini =

Scientific classification
- Domain: Eukaryota
- Kingdom: Animalia
- Phylum: Arthropoda
- Class: Insecta
- Order: Coleoptera
- Suborder: Polyphaga
- Infraorder: Staphyliniformia
- Family: Hydrophilidae
- Subfamily: Hydrophilinae
- Tribe: Amphiopini; Kuwert, 1890

Tribe of beetles

Amphiopini is a tribe in the subfamily Hydrophilinae of aquatic beetles, which was first described in 1890 by August Ferdinand Kuwert, and which has been synonymised with Chaetarthriini.

Members of this tribe are from 3 to 5 mm long.

== Genera ==
(source Short & Fikacek, 2013)

- Amphiops
- Micramphiops
