= Anancylus papuanus =

Scientific classification
- Kingdom: Animalia
- Phylum: Arthropoda
- Class: Insecta
- Order: Coleoptera
- Suborder: Polyphaga
- Infraorder: Cucujiformia
- Family: Cerambycidae
- Genus: Anancylus
- Species: A. papuanus

Binomial name
- Anancylus papuanus Breuning, 1976

Species of beetle

Anancylus papuanus is a species of beetle in the family Cerambycidae. It was described by Stephan von Breuning in 1976. It is known from Papua New Guinea.
