= Tropisternus mixtus =

Scientific classification
- Domain: Eukaryota
- Kingdom: Animalia
- Phylum: Arthropoda
- Class: Insecta
- Order: Coleoptera
- Suborder: Polyphaga
- Infraorder: Staphyliniformia
- Family: Hydrophilidae
- Genus: Tropisternus
- Species: T. mixtus

Binomial name
- Tropisternus mixtus (LeConte, 1855)

Species of beetle

Tropisternus mixtus is a species of water scavenger beetle in the family Hydrophilidae. It is found in North America.
