= Tropisternus glaber =

Scientific classification
- Kingdom: Animalia
- Phylum: Arthropoda
- Clade: Pancrustacea
- Class: Insecta
- Order: Coleoptera
- Suborder: Polyphaga
- Infraorder: Staphyliniformia
- Family: Hydrophilidae
- Genus: Tropisternus
- Species: T. glaber

Binomial name
- Tropisternus glaber (Herbst, 1797)

Species of beetle

Tropisternus glaber is a species of water scavenger beetle in the family Hydrophilidae. It is found in North America.
