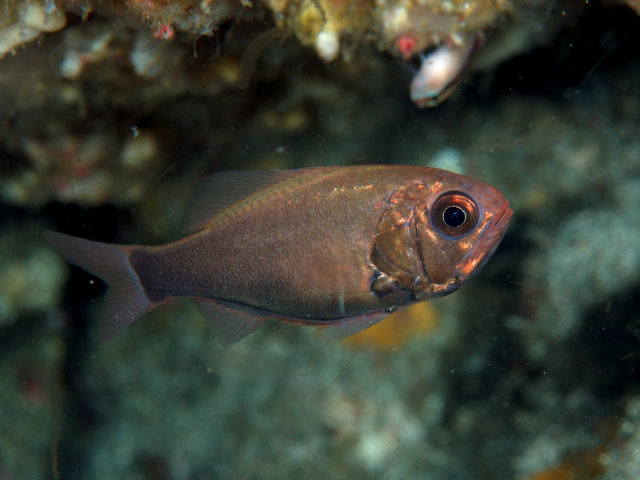

Scientific classification
- Kingdom: Animalia
- Phylum: Chordata
- Class: Actinopterygii
- Order: Trachichthyiformes
- Family: Trachichthyidae
- Genus: Aulotrachichthys
- Species: A. prosthemius

Binomial name
- Aulotrachichthys prosthemius (D. S. Jordan & Fowler, 1902)

Synonyms
- Paratrachichthys prosthemius D. S. Jordan & Fowler, 1902

= Aulotrachichthys prosthemius =

Species of fish

Aulotrachichthys prosthemius, also known as the West Pacific luminous roughy, is a species of slimehead native to the Northern Pacific from Hawaii to Japan. It can be found at depths ranging from 90 to 198 metres (295 to 650 ft), either in open water or near crevices and caves. It has a maximum length of 6.1 centimetres (2.4 in).
