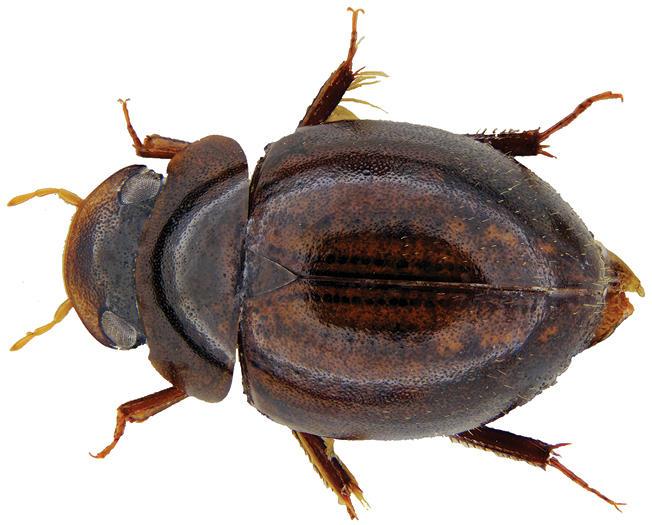
- Amphiops senegalensis

Scientific classification
- Kingdom: Animalia
- Phylum: Arthropoda
- Class: Insecta
- Order: Coleoptera
- Suborder: Polyphaga
- Infraorder: Staphyliniformia
- Family: Hydrophilidae
- Tribe: Amphiopini
- Genus: Amphiops; Erichson, 1843

= Amphiops =

Species of aquatic beetle

Amphiops is a genus of aquatic beetles in the tribe Amphiopini of the family Hydrophilidae, first described by Wilhelm Ferdinand Erichson in 1843.

Species of the genus occur in Africa, Asia and Australia. In Australia they are found in the Northern Territory, Western Australia and Queensland, in wet tropical areas.

== Species ==
The following species are recognised in the genus Amphiops:

- Amphiops australicus (Blackburn, 1898)
- Amphiops austrinus Watts, 1998
- Amphiops caristripus Jia & Feng-Long, 1994
- Amphiops coelopunctatus Jia & Feng-Long, 2014
- Amphiops confusus Régimbart, 1903
- Amphiops coomani Orchymont, 1926
- Amphiops duplopunctatus (Blackburn, 1898)
- Amphiops gibbus (Illiger, 1801)
- Amphiops globus Erichson, 1843
- Amphiops lasioides Régimbart, 1903
- Amphiops mater Sharp, 1873
- Amphiops micropunctatus Watts, 1998
- Amphiops mirabilis Sharp, 1890
- Amphiops namibicus Hebauer, 1995
- Amphiops phallicus Orchymont, 1936
- Amphiops queenslandicus J.Balfour-Browne, 1939
- Amphiops senegalensis (Laporte de Castelnau, 1840)
- Amphiops simplex Sharp, 1890
- Amphiops uhligi Hebauer, 1995
- Amphiops wittei Orchymont, 1941
