= Aulotrachichthys novaezelandicus =

Scientific classification
- Kingdom: Animalia
- Phylum: Chordata
- Class: Actinopterygii
- Order: Trachichthyiformes
- Family: Trachichthyidae
- Genus: Aulotrachichthys
- Species: A. novaezelandicus

Binomial name
- Aulotrachichthys novaezelandicus (Kotlyar, 1980)

Synonyms
- Paratrachichthys novaezelandicus Kotlyar, 1980

Species of fish

Aulotrachichthys novaezelandicus, the New Zealand roughy, is a slimehead found in the Southwest Pacific off the coasts Australia and New Zealand between depths of 30 to 100 metres (98 to 328 ft). It feeds on crustaceans, squid, and other fish.
