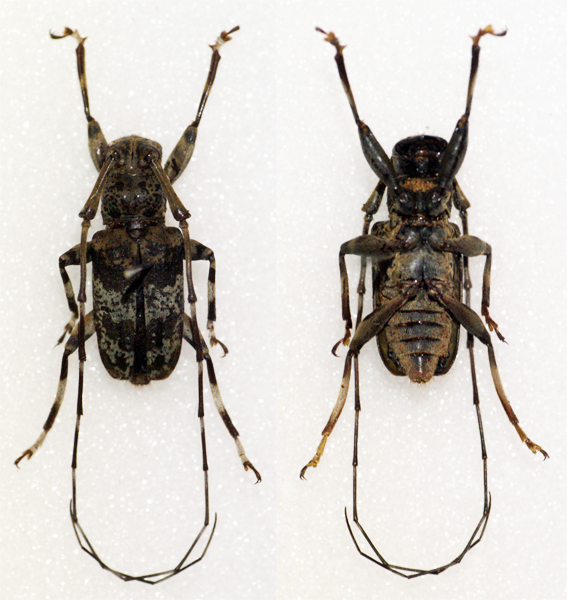
- Anancylus mindanaonis

Scientific classification
- Domain: Eukaryota
- Kingdom: Animalia
- Phylum: Arthropoda
- Class: Insecta
- Order: Coleoptera
- Suborder: Polyphaga
- Infraorder: Cucujiformia
- Family: Cerambycidae
- Tribe: Mesosini
- Genus: Anancylus; J. Thomson, 1864

= Anancylus =

Genus of beetles

Anancylus is a genus of longhorn beetles of the subfamily Lamiinae, containing the following species:

subgenus Anancylus

- Anancylus calceatus J. Thomson, 1864
- Anancylus mindanaonis Breuning, 1968
- Anancylus papuanus Breuning, 1976
- Anancylus vivesi Breuning, 1978

subgenus Paranancylus

- Anancylus albofasciatus (Pic, 1925)
- Anancylus arfakensis Breuning, 1959
- Anancylus griseatus (Pascoe, 1858)
- Anancylus latus Pascoe, 1865
- Anancylus malasiacus Breuning, 1982
- Anancylus socius Pascoe, 1865

subgenus Pseudanancylus

- Anancylus basalis Gahan, 1906
- Anancylus birmanicus Breuning, 1935
