= Anancylus arfakensis =

Scientific classification
- Kingdom: Animalia
- Phylum: Arthropoda
- Class: Insecta
- Order: Coleoptera
- Suborder: Polyphaga
- Infraorder: Cucujiformia
- Family: Cerambycidae
- Genus: Anancylus
- Species: A. arfakensis

Binomial name
- Anancylus arfakensis Breuning, 1959

Species of beetle

Anancylus arfakensis is a species of beetle in the family Cerambycidae. It was described by Stephan von Breuning in 1959. It is known from Indonesia.
