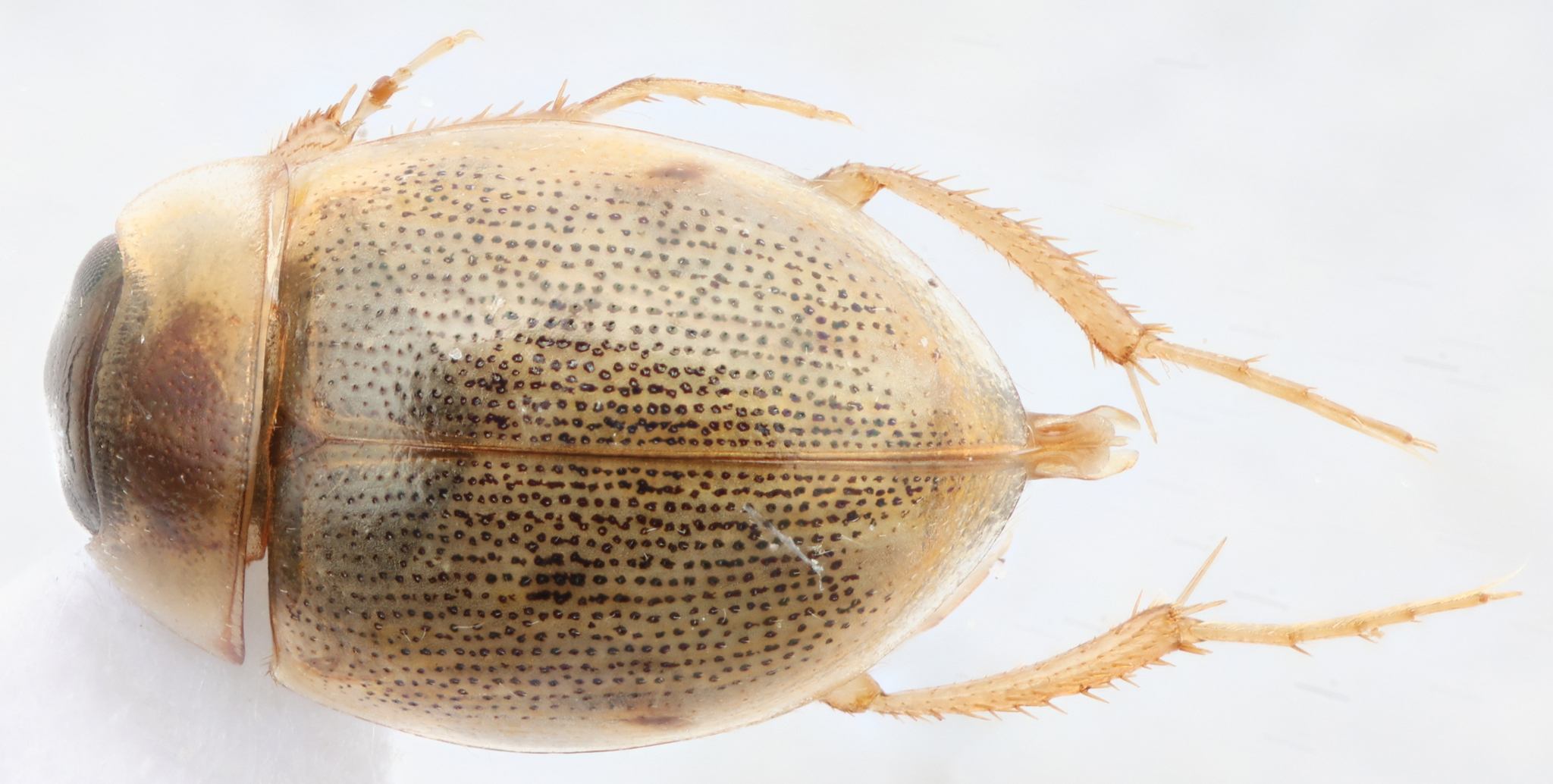

Scientific classification
- Kingdom: Animalia
- Phylum: Arthropoda
- Clade: Pancrustacea
- Class: Insecta
- Order: Coleoptera
- Suborder: Polyphaga
- Infraorder: Staphyliniformia
- Family: Hydrophilidae
- Genus: Laccobius
- Species: L. teneralis

Binomial name
- Laccobius teneralis Cheary, 1971

= Laccobius teneralis =

Species of beetle

Laccobius teneralis is a species of water scavenger beetle in the family Hydrophilidae. It is found in North America.
