= Aspergillus latus =

Scientific classification
- Kingdom: Fungi
- Division: Ascomycota
- Class: Eurotiomycetes
- Order: Eurotiales
- Family: Aspergillaceae
- Genus: Aspergillus
- Subgenus: Aspergillus subg. Nidulantes
- Species: A. latus

Binomial name
- Aspergillus latus (Thom & Raper) A.J. Chen, Frisvad & Samson (2016)

Synonyms
- Aspergillus montenegroi Y. Horie, Miyaji & Nishim. 1996; Emericella montenegroi Y. Horie, Miyaji & Nishim. 1996; Aspergillus nidulans var. latus Thom & Raper 1939; Emericella nidulans var. lata (Thom & Raper) Subram. 1972; Aspergillus sublatus Horie 1979; Emericella sublata Horie 1979

Species of fungus

Aspergillus latus is a species of fungus in the genus Aspergillus in the Nidulantes section.

== Taxonomy ==
The species was first published in 1939 as a variety of Aspergillus nidulans. It was described as separate species in 2016. At the same time, Aspergillus montenegroi and Aspergillus sublatus were found to be homotypic synonyms of A. latus, however as of August 2023, they continue to be listed as accepted species in Index Fungorum.

== Ecology ==
Strains of A. latus have been found worldwide from a variety of sources, notably soil, foods and in association with plants such as Geranium nepalense and Erica.

== Growth and morphology ==
A. latus has been cultivated on both Czapek yeast extract agar (CYA) plates and Malt Extract Agar Oxoid® (MEAOX) plates. The growth morphology of the colonies can be seen in the pictures below.

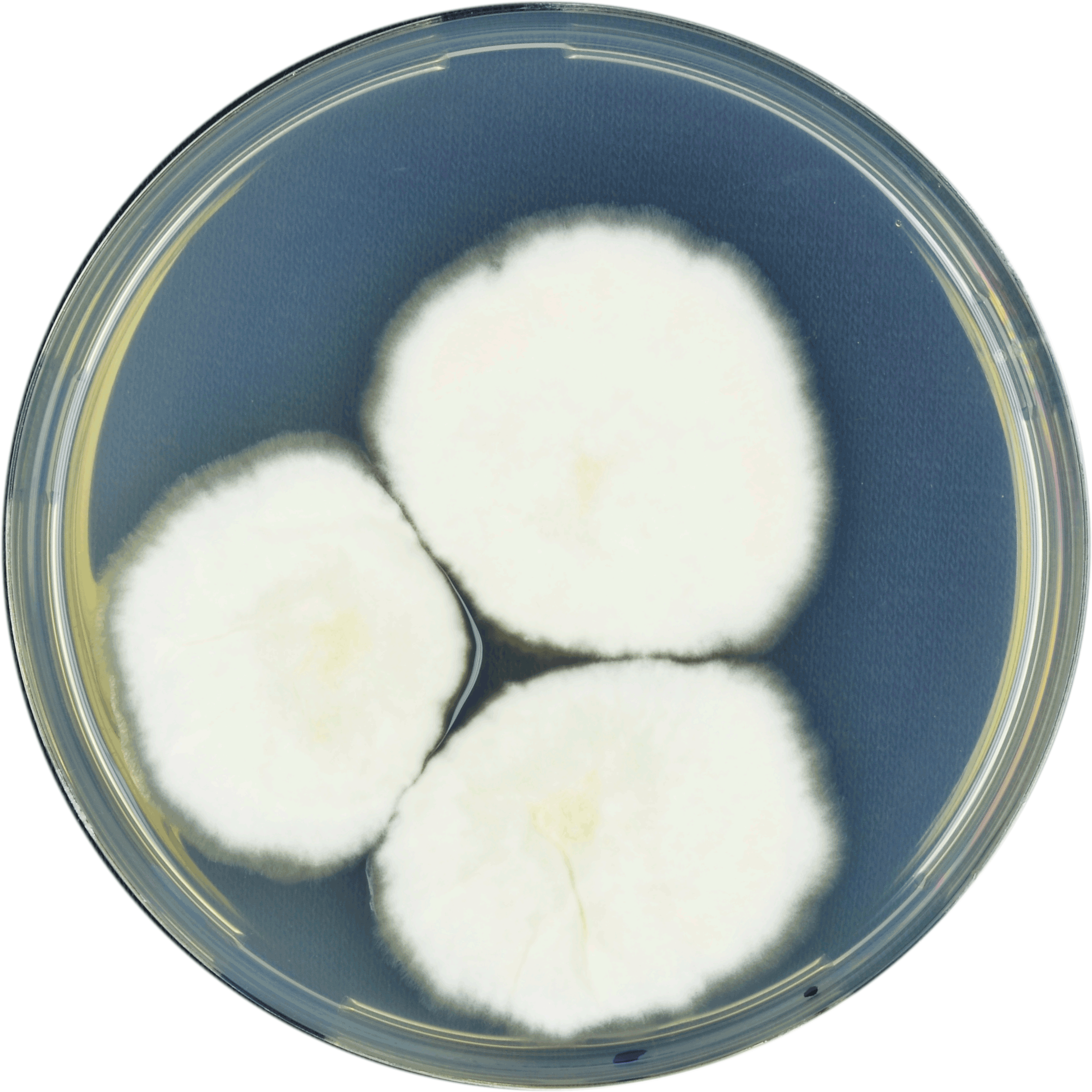
Aspergillus latus growing on CYA plate

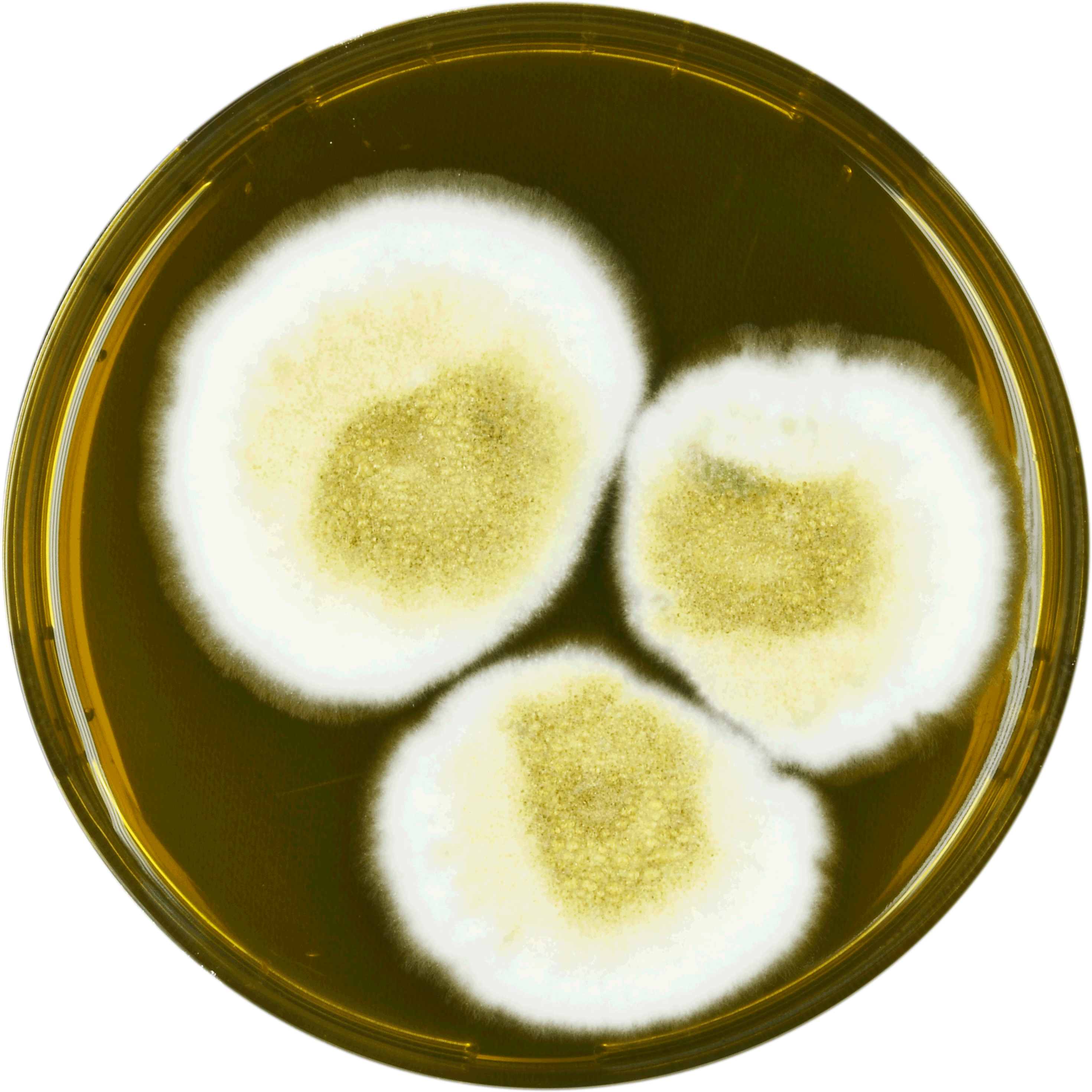
Aspergillus latus growing on MEAOX plate
