= Aulotrachichthys argyrophanus =

Conservation status
- Data Deficient (IUCN 3.1)

Scientific classification
- Kingdom: Animalia
- Phylum: Chordata
- Class: Actinopterygii
- Order: Trachichthyiformes
- Family: Trachichthyidae
- Genus: Aulotrachichthys
- Species: A. argyrophanus

Binomial name
- Aulotrachichthys argyrophanus Woods, 1961

Species of fish

Aulotrachichthys argyrophanus, the western luminous roughy, is a slimehead from the family Trachichthyidae. It is found in the southwest Atlantic, off the Amazon River mouth in northern Brazil. It can be found as deep as 229 metres (751 ft) and can reach lengths of up to 7.5 centimetres (3.0 in) SL.
