= Aulotrachichthys pulsator =

Scientific classification
- Kingdom: Animalia
- Phylum: Chordata
- Class: Actinopterygii
- Order: Trachichthyiformes
- Family: Trachichthyidae
- Genus: Aulotrachichthys
- Species: A. pulsator

Binomial name
- Aulotrachichthys pulsator M. F. Gomon & Kuiter, 1987

Synonyms
- Paratrachichthys pulsator (M. F. Gomon & Kuiter, 1987)

Species of fish

Aulotrachichthys pulsator, the golden roughy, is a slimehead. It is found in the eastern Indian Ocean around south Australia down to depths of around 25 m (82 ft) where it lives in rock reefs. It can grow to a length of 8 cm (3.1 in).
