= Aulotrachichthys heptalepis =

Scientific classification
- Domain: Eukaryota
- Kingdom: Animalia
- Phylum: Chordata
- Class: Actinopterygii
- Order: Trachichthyiformes
- Family: Trachichthyidae
- Genus: Aulotrachichthys
- Species: A. heptalepis

Binomial name
- Aulotrachichthys heptalepis (Gon, 1984)

Synonyms
- Paratrachichthys heptalepis Gon, 1984

Species of fish

Aulotrachichthys heptalepis, also known as the Hawaiian luminous roughy, is a slimehead fish found in the Hawaiian Islands south of Niihau, the westernmost island. It has a depth range of 50 to 100 metres (160 to 330 ft). They reach a maximum total length of about 6.7 centimetres (2.6 in). It was first described in 1984 after 33 individuals were caught by the U.S. National Marine Fisheries Service in a series of cruises of the Hawaiian Islands.
