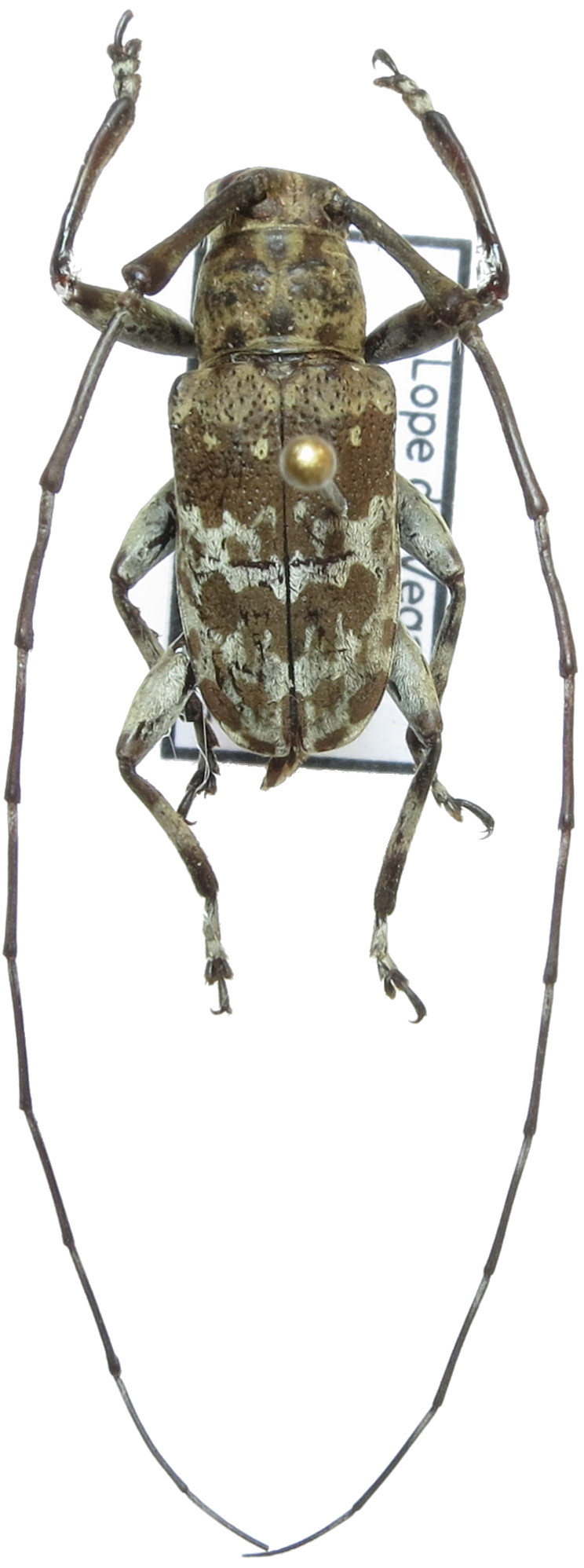
- A. mindanaonis from Philippines

Scientific classification
- Kingdom: Animalia
- Phylum: Arthropoda
- Class: Insecta
- Order: Coleoptera
- Suborder: Polyphaga
- Infraorder: Cucujiformia
- Family: Cerambycidae
- Genus: Anancylus
- Species: A. mindanaonis

Binomial name
- Anancylus mindanaonis Breuning, 1968

= Anancylus mindanaonis =

Species of beetle

Anancylus mindanaonis is a species of beetle in the family Cerambycidae. It was described by Stephan von Breuning in 1968. It is known from the Philippines.
