= Anancylus albofasciatus =

Scientific classification
- Kingdom: Animalia
- Phylum: Arthropoda
- Class: Insecta
- Order: Coleoptera
- Suborder: Polyphaga
- Infraorder: Cucujiformia
- Family: Cerambycidae
- Genus: Anancylus
- Species: A. albofasciatus

Binomial name
- Anancylus albofasciatus (Pic, 1925)

Synonyms
- Ereis albofasciata Pic, 1925; Pseudanancylus albofasciatus (Pic, 1925)

Species of beetle

Anancylus albofasciatus is a species of beetle in the family Cerambycidae. It was described by Maurice Pic in 1925. It is known from Vietnam.
