= Laccobius minutoides =

Scientific classification
- Domain: Eukaryota
- Kingdom: Animalia
- Phylum: Arthropoda
- Class: Insecta
- Order: Coleoptera
- Suborder: Polyphaga
- Infraorder: Staphyliniformia
- Family: Hydrophilidae
- Genus: Laccobius
- Species: L. minutoides

Binomial name
- Laccobius minutoides Orchymont, 1942

Species of beetle

Laccobius minutoides is a species of water scavenger beetle in the family Hydrophilidae. It is found in North America.
