= Anancylus basalis =

Scientific classification
- Domain: Eukaryota
- Kingdom: Animalia
- Phylum: Arthropoda
- Class: Insecta
- Order: Coleoptera
- Suborder: Polyphaga
- Infraorder: Cucujiformia
- Family: Cerambycidae
- Genus: Anancylus
- Species: A. basalis

Binomial name
- Anancylus basalis Gahan, 1906

Species of beetle

Anancylus basalis is a species of beetle in the family Cerambycidae. It was described by Charles Joseph Gahan in 1906. It is known from Sumatra and Malaysia.
