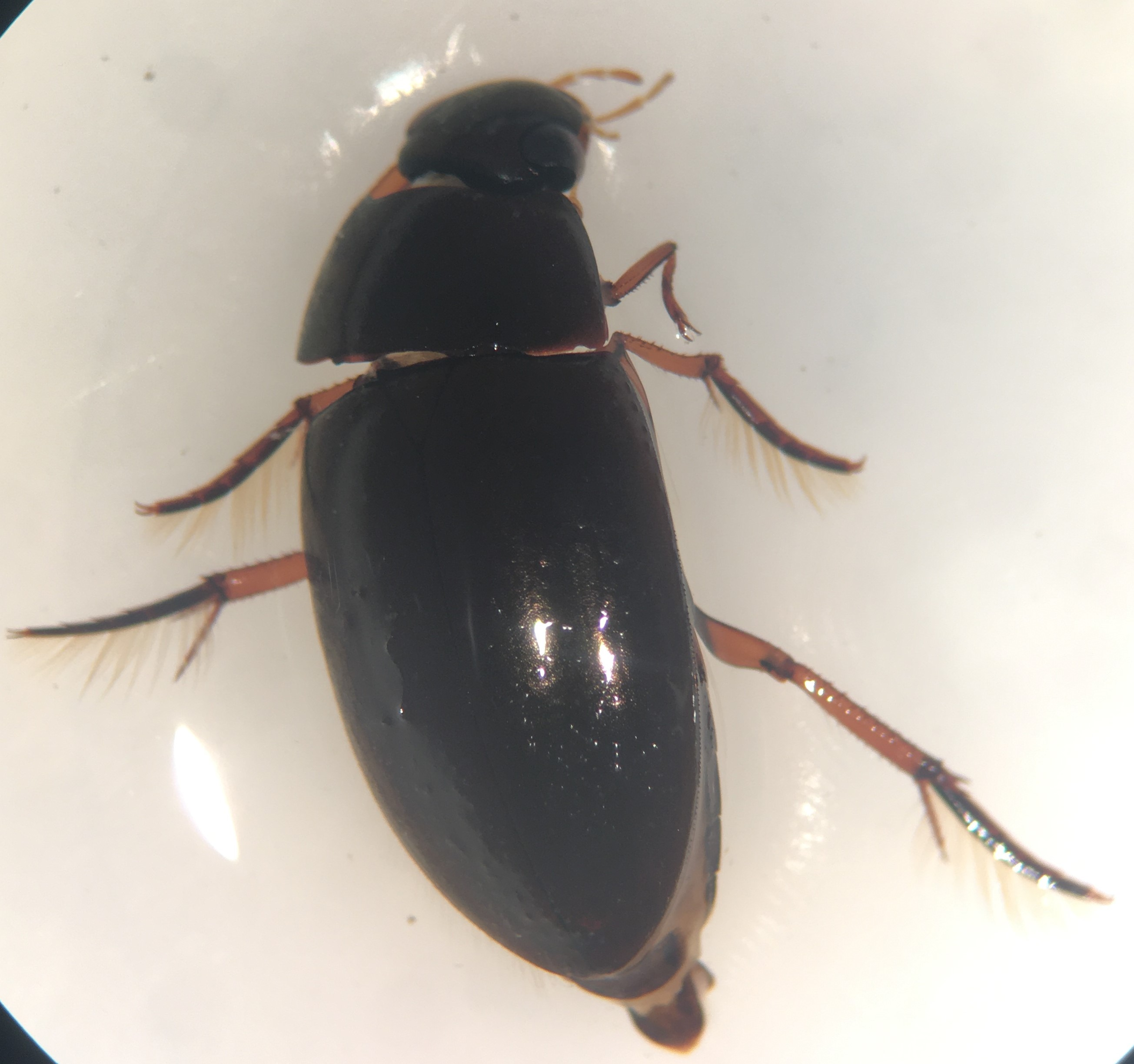

Scientific classification
- Domain: Eukaryota
- Kingdom: Animalia
- Phylum: Arthropoda
- Class: Insecta
- Order: Coleoptera
- Suborder: Polyphaga
- Infraorder: Staphyliniformia
- Family: Hydrophilidae
- Genus: Tropisternus
- Species: T. quadristriatus

Binomial name
- Tropisternus quadristriatus (Horn, 1871)

= Tropisternus quadristriatus =

Species of beetle

Tropisternus quadristriatus is a species of water scavenger beetle in the family Hydrophilidae. It is found in the Caribbean and North America.
