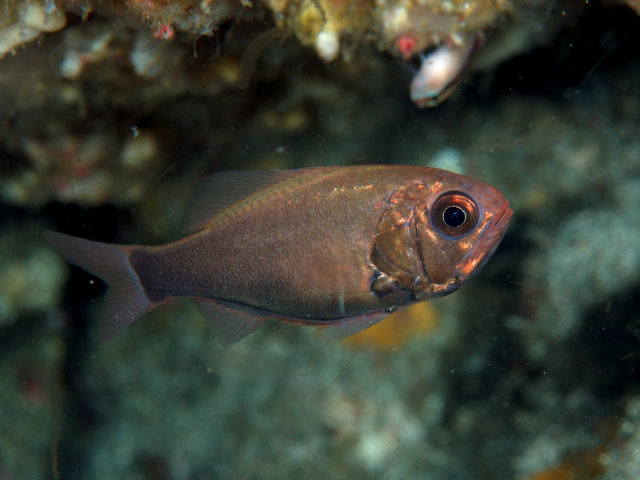
- A. prosthemius

Scientific classification
- Kingdom: Animalia
- Phylum: Chordata
- Class: Actinopterygii
- Order: Trachichthyiformes
- Family: Trachichthyidae
- Genus: Aulotrachichthys; Fowler, 1938

= Aulotrachichthys =

Genus of fishes

Aulotrachichthys is a genus of slimeheads. Most species in this genus are known as luminous roughies.

== Species ==
The currently recognized species in this genus are:

- Aulotrachichthys argyrophanus (Woods, 1961) (Western luminous roughy)
- Aulotrachichthys atlanticus (Menezes, 1971) (Brazilian luminous roughy)
- Aulotrachichthys heptalepis (Gon, 1984) (Hawaiian luminous roughy)
- Aulotrachichthys latus (Fowler, 1938) (Philippine luminous roughy)
- Aulotrachichthys novaezelandicus (Kotlyar, 1980) (New Zealand roughy)
- Aulotrachichthys prosthemius (D. S. Jordan & Fowler, 1902) (West Pacific luminous roughy)
- Aulotrachichthys pulsator M. F. Gomon & Kuiter, 1987 (golden roughy)
- Aulotrachichthys sajademalensis (Kotlyar, 1979) (Saya de Malha luminous roughy)
