= Pelthydrus suffarcinatus =

Scientific classification
- Kingdom: Animalia
- Phylum: Arthropoda
- Class: Insecta
- Order: Coleoptera
- Suborder: Polyphaga
- Infraorder: Staphyliniformia
- Family: Hydrophilidae
- Genus: Pelthydrus
- Species: P. suffarcinatus

Binomial name
- Pelthydrus suffarcinatus Schönmann, 1995

Species of beetle

Pelthydrus suffarcinatus, is a species of water scavenger beetle endemic to Sri Lanka.

== Description ==
Body length of male is about 2.35 to 2.60 mm.
