= Aulotrachichthys atlanticus =

Scientific classification
- Domain: Eukaryota
- Kingdom: Animalia
- Phylum: Chordata
- Class: Actinopterygii
- Order: Trachichthyiformes
- Family: Trachichthyidae
- Genus: Aulotrachichthys
- Species: A. atlanticus

Binomial name
- Aulotrachichthys atlanticus (Menezes, 1971)

Synonyms
- Paratrachichthys atlanticus Menezes, 1971

Aulotrachichthys atlanticus, the Brazilian luminous roughy, is a slimehead from the family Trachichthyidae. It is found in the southwestern Atlantic off the coasts of Brazil, Uruguay and Argentina at depths between 115 and 210 metres (377 and 689 ft). It can reach a maximum length of 10.3 centimetres (4.1 in).
