= Anancylus calceatus =

Scientific classification
- Kingdom: Animalia
- Phylum: Arthropoda
- Clade: Pancrustacea
- Class: Insecta
- Order: Coleoptera
- Suborder: Polyphaga
- Infraorder: Cucujiformia
- Family: Cerambycidae
- Genus: Anancylus
- Species: A. calceatus

Binomial name
- Anancylus calceatus J. Thomson, 1864

Species of beetle

Anancylus calceatus is a species of beetle in the family Cerambycidae. It was described by James Thomson in 1864. It is known from Java, Borneo and Sumatra.
