= Anancylus griseatus =

Scientific classification
- Kingdom: Animalia
- Phylum: Arthropoda
- Clade: Pancrustacea
- Class: Insecta
- Order: Coleoptera
- Suborder: Polyphaga
- Infraorder: Cucujiformia
- Family: Cerambycidae
- Genus: Anancylus
- Species: A. griseatus

Binomial name
- Anancylus griseatus (Pascoe, 1858)

Synonyms
- Anancylus granulosus Schwarzer, 1924; Mesosa griseata Pascoe, 1858

Species of beetle

Anancylus griseatus is a species of beetle in the family Cerambycidae. It was described by Francis Polkinghorne Pascoe in 1858. It is known from Malaysia, Sumatra and Borneo.
