= Hydrobius melaenus =

Scientific classification
- Domain: Eukaryota
- Kingdom: Animalia
- Phylum: Arthropoda
- Class: Insecta
- Order: Coleoptera
- Suborder: Polyphaga
- Infraorder: Staphyliniformia
- Family: Hydrophilidae
- Genus: Hydrobius
- Species: H. melaenus

Binomial name
- Hydrobius melaenus (Germar, 1824)

Synonyms
- Hydrobius globosus (Say, 1824)

Species of beetle

Hydrobius melaenus is a species of water scavenger beetle in the family Hydrophilidae. It is found in North America.
