= Tropisternus columbianus =

Scientific classification
- Domain: Eukaryota
- Kingdom: Animalia
- Phylum: Arthropoda
- Class: Insecta
- Order: Coleoptera
- Suborder: Polyphaga
- Infraorder: Staphyliniformia
- Family: Hydrophilidae
- Genus: Tropisternus
- Species: T. columbianus

Binomial name
- Tropisternus columbianus Brown, 1931

Species of beetle

Tropisternus columbianus is a species of water scavenger beetle in the family Hydrophilidae. It is found in Central America and North America.
