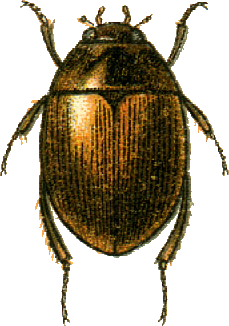

Scientific classification
- Domain: Eukaryota
- Kingdom: Animalia
- Phylum: Arthropoda
- Class: Insecta
- Order: Coleoptera
- Suborder: Polyphaga
- Infraorder: Staphyliniformia
- Family: Hydrophilidae
- Genus: Laccobius
- Species: L. cinereus

Binomial name
- Laccobius cinereus Motschulsky, 1860

= Laccobius cinereus =

Species of beetle

Laccobius cinereus is a species of water scavenger beetle in the family Hydrophilidae. It is found in Europe and Northern Asia (excluding China) and North America.

== Subspecies ==
These two subspecies belong to the species Laccobius cinereus:

- Laccobius cinereus cinereus Motschulsky, 1860
- Laccobius cinereus columbianus Miller, 1965
