= Anancylus malasiacus =

Scientific classification
- Kingdom: Animalia
- Phylum: Arthropoda
- Class: Insecta
- Order: Coleoptera
- Suborder: Polyphaga
- Infraorder: Cucujiformia
- Family: Cerambycidae
- Genus: Anancylus
- Species: A. malasiacus

Binomial name
- Anancylus malasiacus Breuning, 1982

Species of beetle

Anancylus malasiacus is a species of beetle in the family Cerambycidae. It was described by Stephan von Breuning in 1982. It is known from Borneo and Malaysia.
