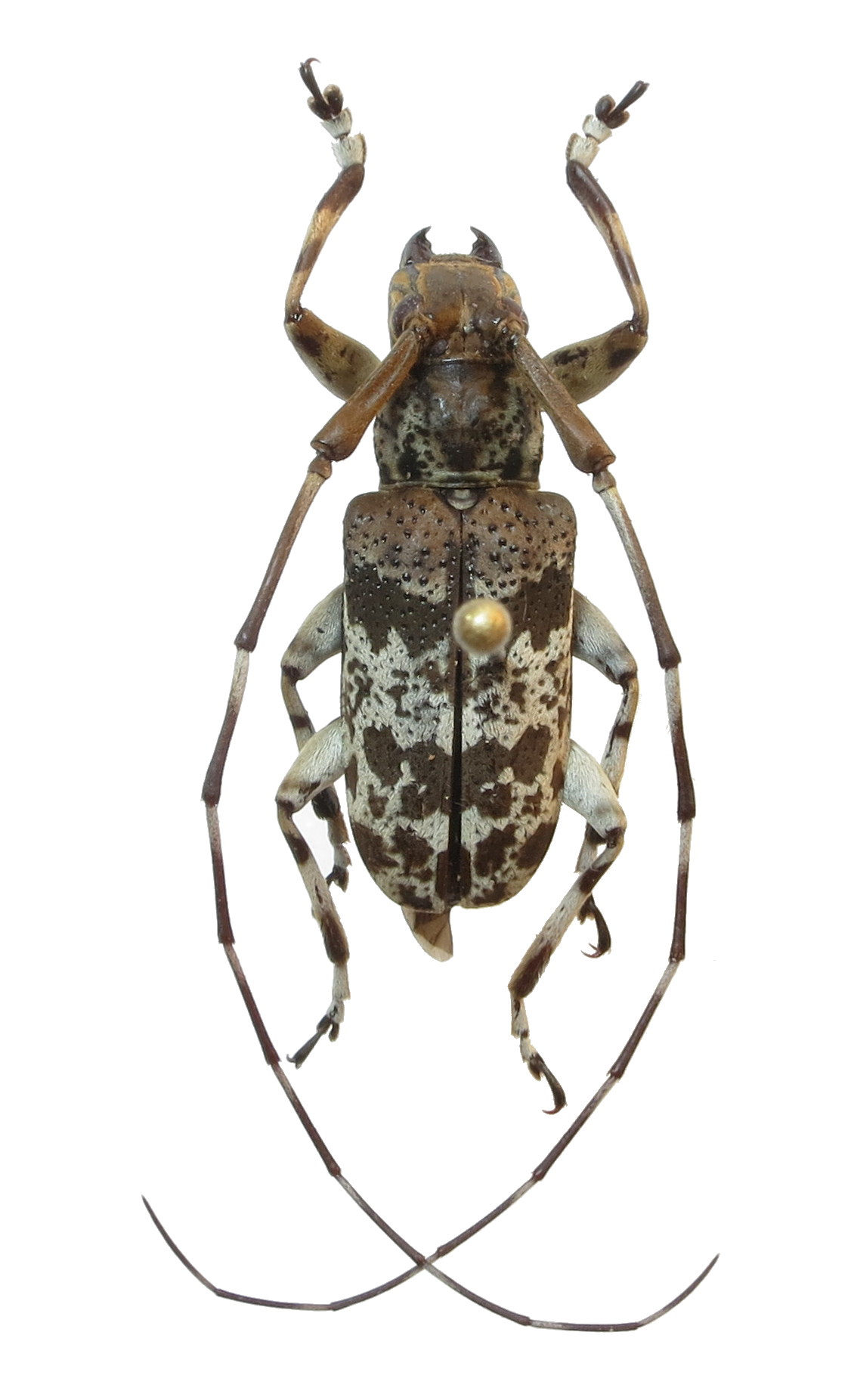
- A. socius from Philippines

Scientific classification
- Domain: Eukaryota
- Kingdom: Animalia
- Phylum: Arthropoda
- Class: Insecta
- Order: Coleoptera
- Suborder: Polyphaga
- Infraorder: Cucujiformia
- Family: Cerambycidae
- Genus: Anancylus
- Species: A. socius

Binomial name
- Anancylus socius Pascoe, 1865

Synonyms
- Anancylus simulans Pascoe, 1865; Anancylus strix Heller, 1915; Anancylus vicarius Heller, 1922

= Anancylus socius =

Species of beetle

Anancylus socius is a species of beetle in the family Cerambycidae. It was described by Francis Polkinghorne Pascoe in 1865. It is known from the Philippines and Malaysia. It contains the varietas Anancylus socius var. dissolutus.

== Subspecies ==
- Anancylus socius palawanicus Breuning, 1965
- Anancylus socius socius Pascoe, 1865
