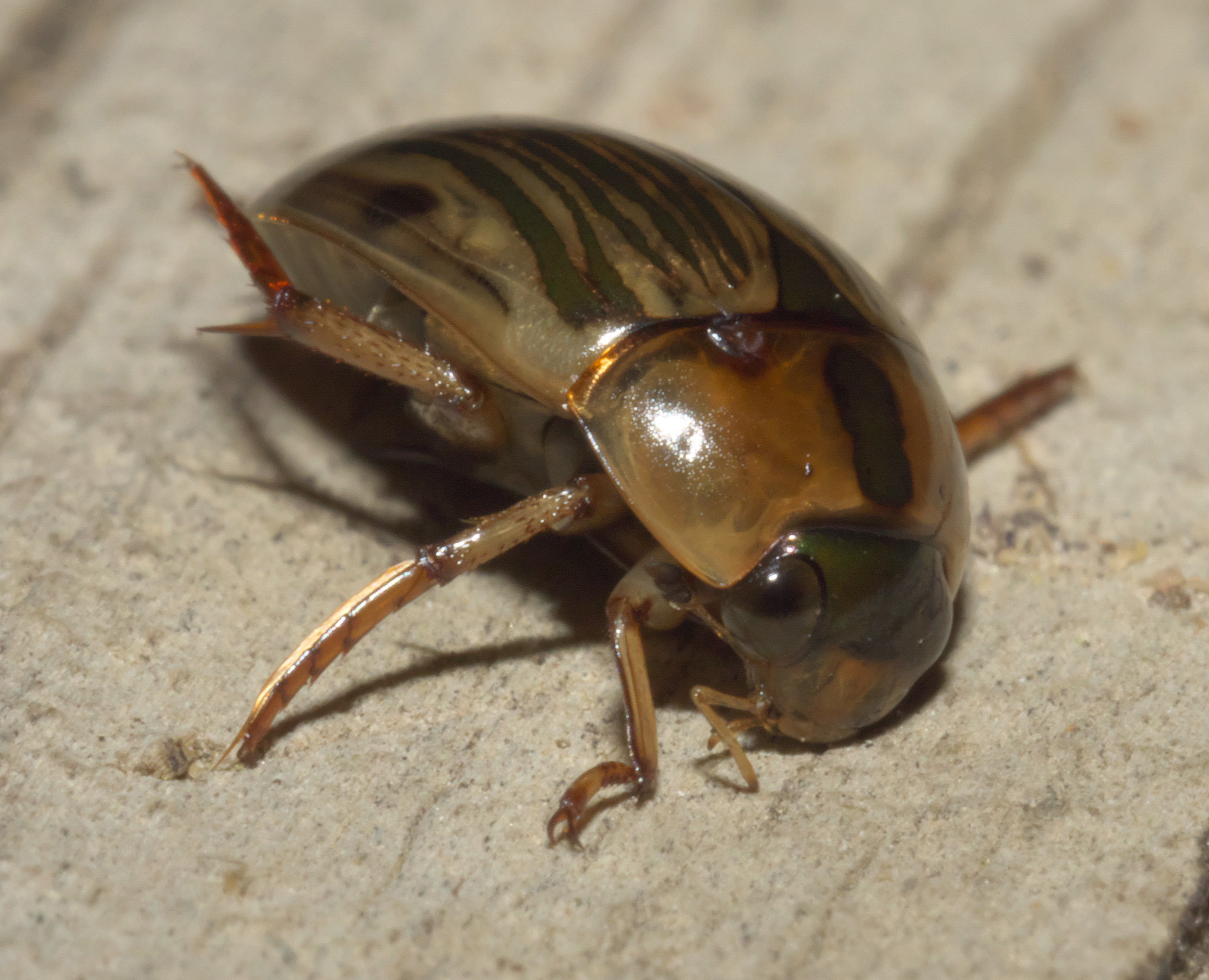

Scientific classification
- Domain: Eukaryota
- Kingdom: Animalia
- Phylum: Arthropoda
- Class: Insecta
- Order: Coleoptera
- Suborder: Polyphaga
- Infraorder: Staphyliniformia
- Family: Hydrophilidae
- Genus: Tropisternus
- Species: T. collaris

Binomial name
- Tropisternus collaris (Fabricius, 1775)

= Tropisternus collaris =

Species of beetle

Tropisternus collaris, the collared water scavenger beetle, is a species of water scavenger beetle in the family Hydrophilidae. It is found in the Caribbean, North America, and South America.

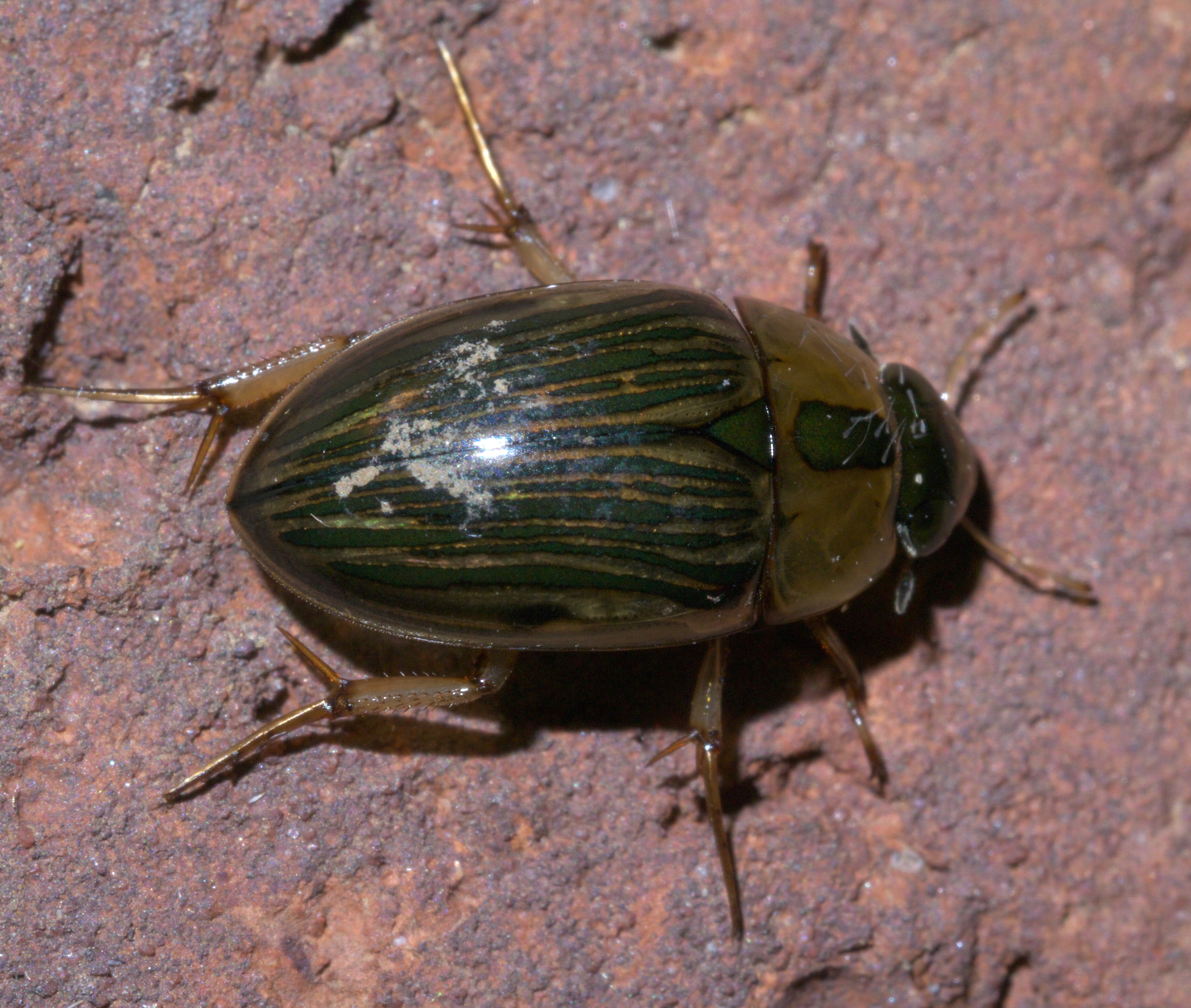
collared water scavenger beetle, Tropisternus collaris, Pryor, OK, USA

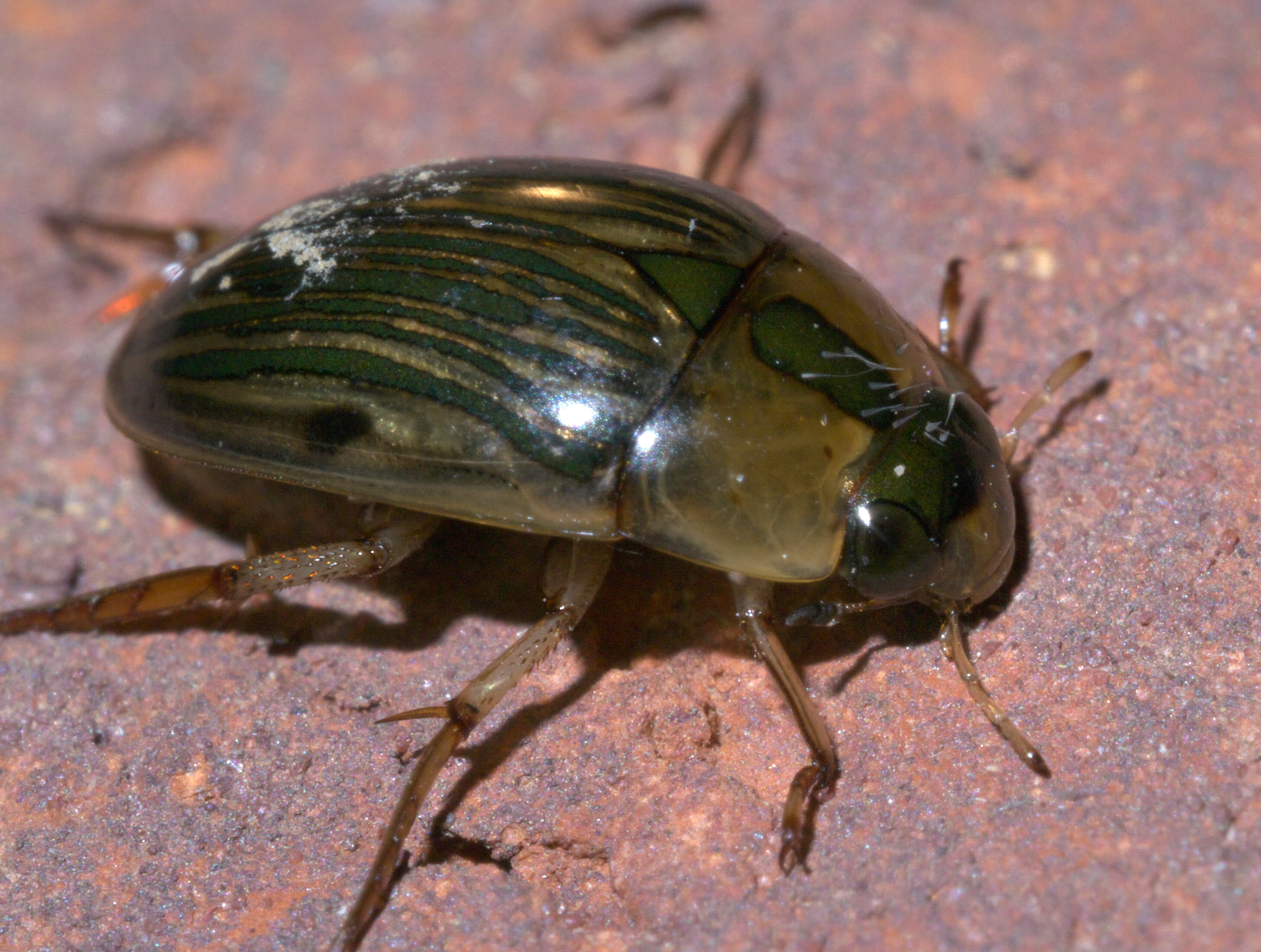
collared water scavenger beetle, Tropisternus collaris, Pryor, OK, USA

== Subspecies ==
- Tropisternus collaris collaris (Fabricius, 1775)
- Tropisternus collaris mexicanus Laporte, 1840
- Tropisternus collaris proximus Sharp, 1883
- Tropisternus collaris striolatus (LeConte, 1855)
- Tropisternus collaris viridis Young and Spangler, 1956
