= Laccobius agilis =

Scientific classification
- Domain: Eukaryota
- Kingdom: Animalia
- Phylum: Arthropoda
- Class: Insecta
- Order: Coleoptera
- Suborder: Polyphaga
- Infraorder: Staphyliniformia
- Family: Hydrophilidae
- Genus: Laccobius
- Species: L. agilis

Binomial name
- Laccobius agilis (Randall, 1838)

Synonyms
- Laccobius acutipennis Miller, 1965; Laccobius punctatus Melsheimer, 1844

Species of beetle

Laccobius agilis is a species of water scavenger beetle in the family Hydrophilidae. It is found in North America.
