= Amphiops austrinus =

Scientific classification
- Domain: Eukaryota
- Kingdom: Animalia
- Phylum: Arthropoda
- Class: Insecta
- Order: Coleoptera
- Suborder: Polyphaga
- Infraorder: Staphyliniformia
- Family: Hydrophilidae
- Genus: Amphiops
- Species: A. austrinus

Binomial name
- Amphiops austrinus Watts, 1998

Species of water beetle

Amphiops austrinus is a species of water beetle in the family Hydrophilidae, first described by Chris H.S. Watts in 1998.

Both larvae and adults are aquatic. The species is found in freshwater, in coastal zones of Queensland.
