= Aulotrachichthys sajademalensis =

Scientific classification
- Domain: Eukaryota
- Kingdom: Animalia
- Phylum: Chordata
- Class: Actinopterygii
- Order: Trachichthyiformes
- Family: Trachichthyidae
- Genus: Aulotrachichthys
- Species: A. sajademalensis

Binomial name
- Aulotrachichthys sajademalensis (Kotlyar, 1979)

Synonyms
- Paratrachichthys sajademalensis Kotlyar, 1979

Species of fish

Aulotrachichthys sajademalensis, the Saya de Malha luminous roughy, is a species of slimehead that is native to Saya de Malha in the Indian Ocean, the Kyushu–Palau Ridge in the Pacific Ocean, and the Nazareth Banks in the Mediterranean. Found at depths ranging from 143 to 274 m (469 to 899 ft), it can reach up to 9.6 cm (3.8 in) in size.
