= Anancylus birmanicus =

Scientific classification
- Kingdom: Animalia
- Phylum: Arthropoda
- Class: Insecta
- Order: Coleoptera
- Suborder: Polyphaga
- Infraorder: Cucujiformia
- Family: Cerambycidae
- Genus: Anancylus
- Species: A. birmanicus

Binomial name
- Anancylus birmanicus Breuning, 1935

Synonyms
- Pseudanancylus birmanicus Breuning, 1935

Species of beetle

Anancylus birmanicus is a species of beetle in the family Cerambycidae. It was described by Stephan von Breuning in 1935. It is known from Myanmar.
