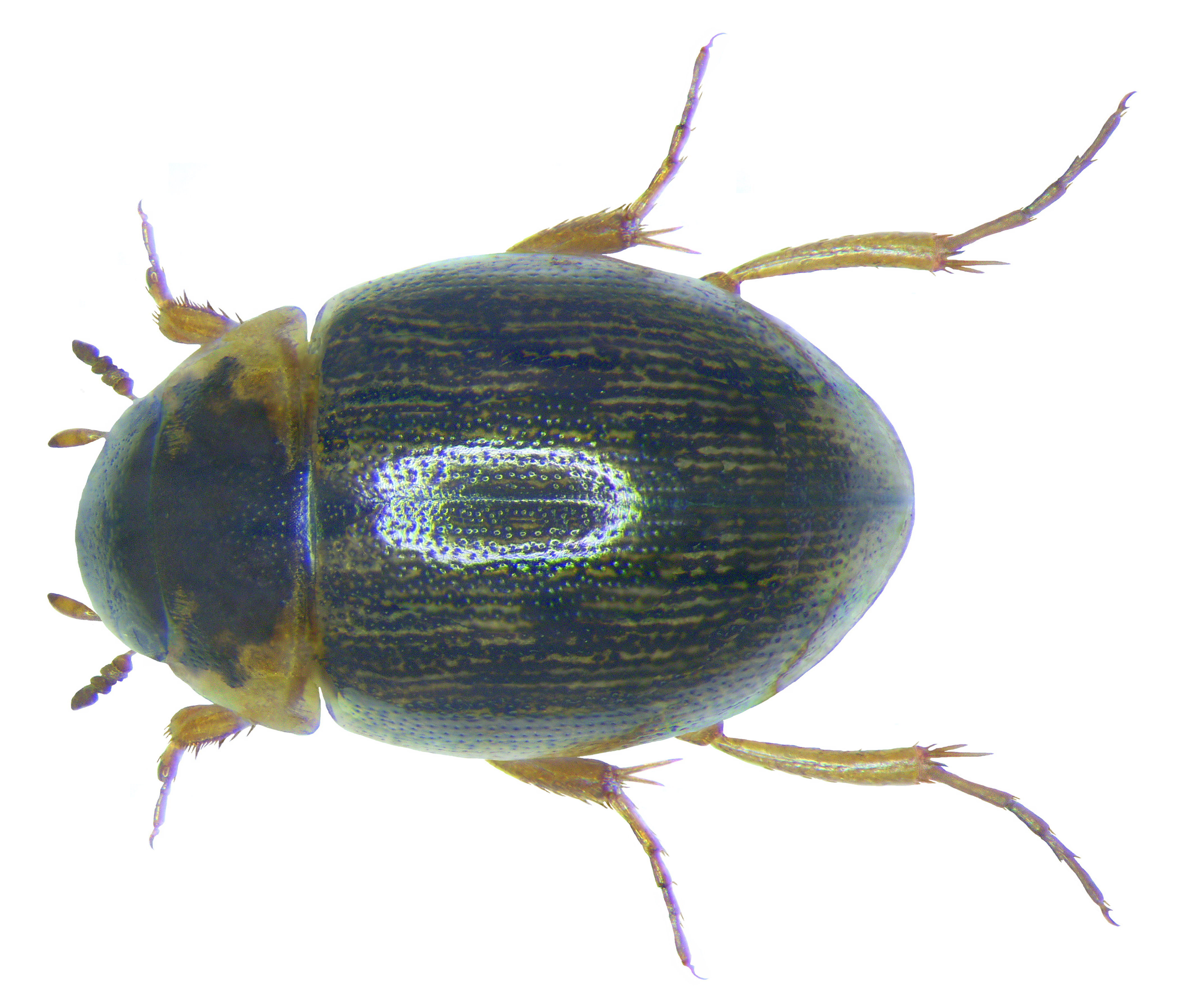
- Laccobius bipunctatus

Scientific classification
- Domain: Eukaryota
- Kingdom: Animalia
- Phylum: Arthropoda
- Class: Insecta
- Order: Coleoptera
- Suborder: Polyphaga
- Infraorder: Staphyliniformia
- Family: Hydrophilidae
- Subfamily: Hydrophilinae
- Tribe: Laccobiini; Bertrand, 1954

= Laccobiini =

Tribe of beetles

Laccobiini is a tribe in the subfamily Hydrophilinae of aquatic beetles, and it contains 367 species in 8 genera.

== Genera ==
- Arabhydrus
- Hydrophilomima
- Laccobius
- Oocyclus
- Ophthalmocyclus
- Pelthydrus
- Scoliopsis
- Tritonus
