= Anancylus vivesi =

Scientific classification
- Kingdom: Animalia
- Phylum: Arthropoda
- Class: Insecta
- Order: Coleoptera
- Suborder: Polyphaga
- Infraorder: Cucujiformia
- Family: Cerambycidae
- Genus: Anancylus
- Species: A. vivesi

Binomial name
- Anancylus vivesi Breuning, 1978

Species of beetle

Anancylus vivesi is a species of beetle in the family Cerambycidae. It was described by Stephan von Breuning in 1978. It is known from Papua New Guinea.
