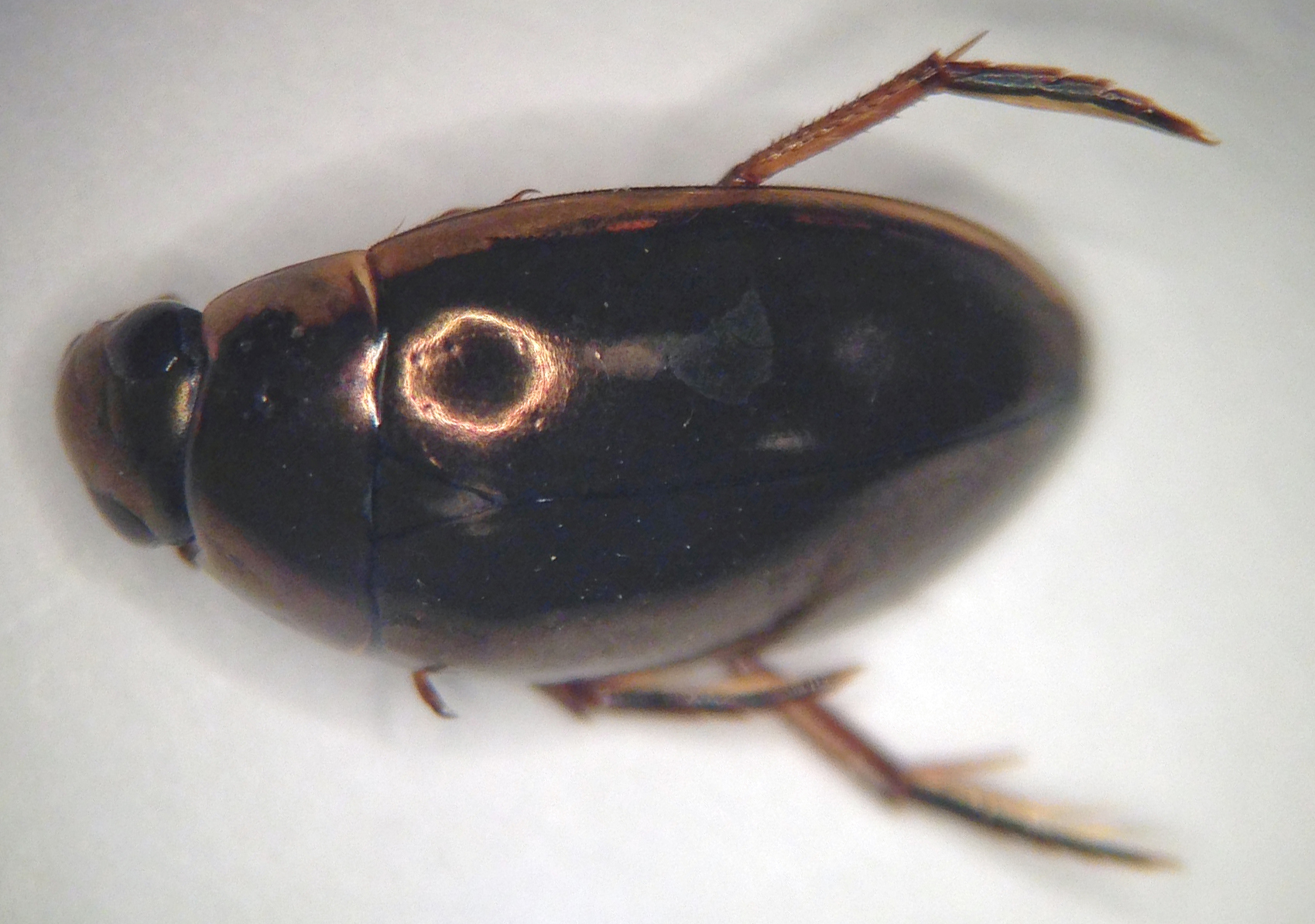
- Adult Tropisternus lateralis

Scientific classification
- Kingdom: Animalia
- Phylum: Arthropoda
- Class: Insecta
- Order: Coleoptera
- Suborder: Polyphaga
- Infraorder: Staphyliniformia
- Family: Hydrophilidae
- Genus: Tropisternus
- Species: T. lateralis

Binomial name
- Tropisternus lateralis (Fabricius, 1775)

= Tropisternus lateralis =

Species of beetle

Tropisternus lateralis is a species of hydrophilid beetle that ranges across much of the Americas.

== Description ==
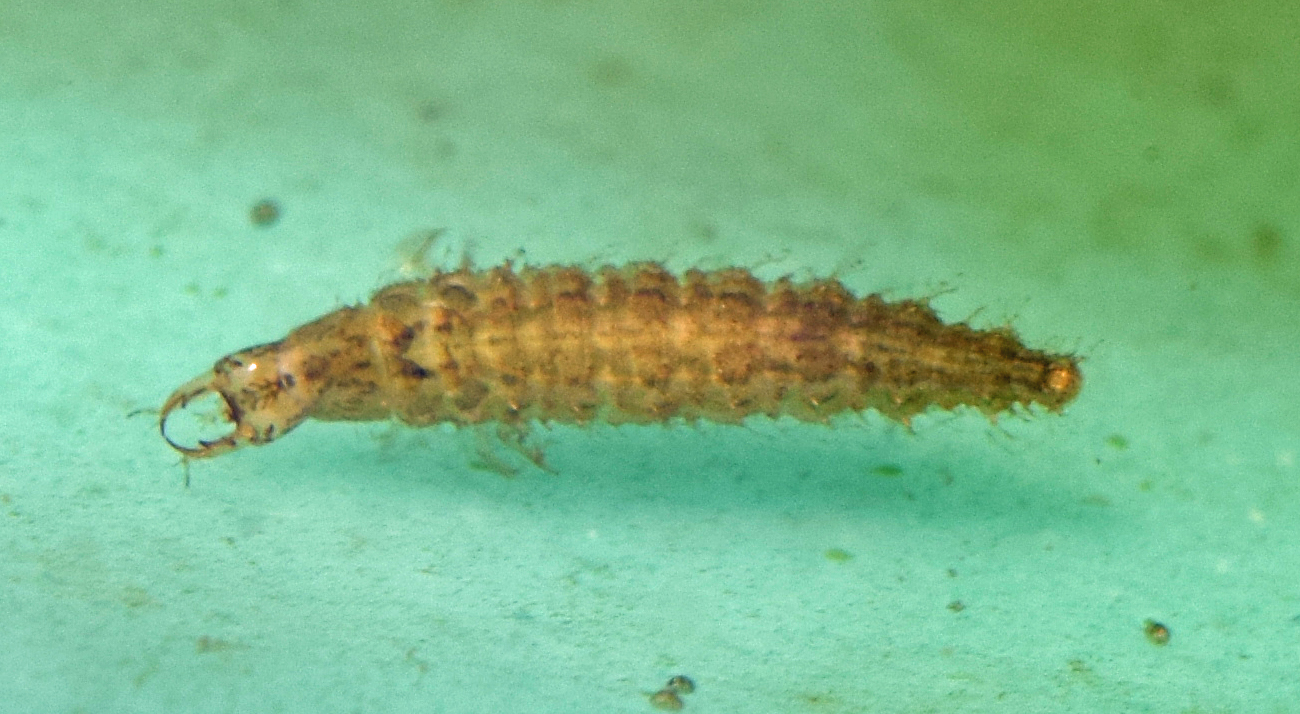
T. lateralis larva

Adult T. lateralis nimabatus, the subspecies found in the eastern United States, are distinguished by having uniformly dark elytra and pronotum with light-colored borders.

== Distribution ==
The range of T. lateralis includes North America as far north as southern Canada, South America south to northern Chile and Argentina, the Caribbean, and the Galápagos Islands. T. lateralis humeralis has been accidentally introduced to Oahu.

== Behavior ==
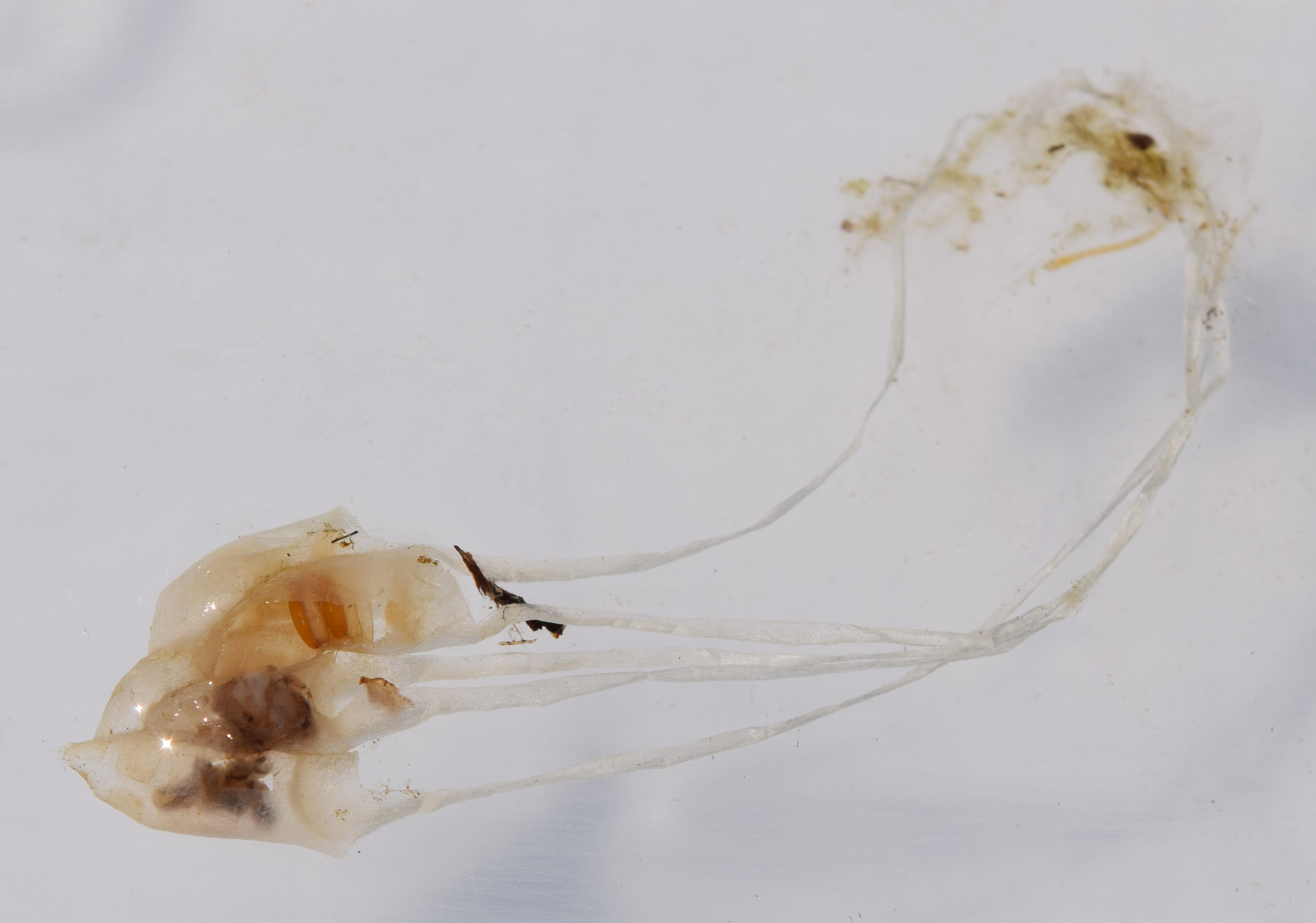
Five T. lateralis egg cases with individual eggs visible inside one of the egg cases

T. lateralis exhibits stridulation during stress, calling, and courtship. Eggs are deposited in cases under water, and larvae are fully aquatic. While adults are primarily aquatic, they breathe air and can fly. Adult T. lateralis avoid colonizing and laying egg cases in ponds that contain fish, which are potential predators of all life stages of the beetles.

== Subspecies ==
There are five recognized subspecies of Tropisternus lateralis.

- Tropisternus lateralis humeralis Motschulsky, 1850
- Tropisternus lateralis lateralis (Fabricius, 1775)
- Tropisternus lateralis limbalis (LeConte, 1855)
- Tropisternus lateralis limbatus (Brullé, 1837)
- Tropisternus lateralis nimbatus (Say, 1823)
