= Abacetus latus =

Scientific classification
- Kingdom: Animalia
- Phylum: Arthropoda
- Class: Insecta
- Order: Coleoptera
- Suborder: Adephaga
- Family: Carabidae
- Genus: Abacetus
- Species: A. latus

Binomial name
- Abacetus latus Tschitscherine, 1898

Species of beetle

Abacetus latus is a species of ground beetle in the subfamily Pterostichinae. It was described by Tschitscherine in 1898 and is found in Cameroon and Ghana.
