= August Ferdinand Kuwert =

German entomologist (1828–1894)

August Ferdinand Kuwert (15 October 1828, Nidden – 14 August 1894, Wernsdorf, südl. von Königsberg) was a German entomologist who specialised in Coleoptera.

He was a Rittergutsbesitzer (owner of an estate or Junker) near the Prussian town of Wernsberg. Kuwert described many new species of Passalidae, Cleridae, Helophoridae, Hydrophilidae, Hydraenidae, Elmidae, Heteroceridae and Dryopidae.

== Works ==
Partial list

- 1891 Systematische Uebersicht der Passaliden-Arten und Gattungen. Deutsche Entomologische Zeitschrift I:161-192.
- 1897 Die Passaliden Dichotomisch Bearbeitet, die Arten. Nov. Zool. 4:274-306
