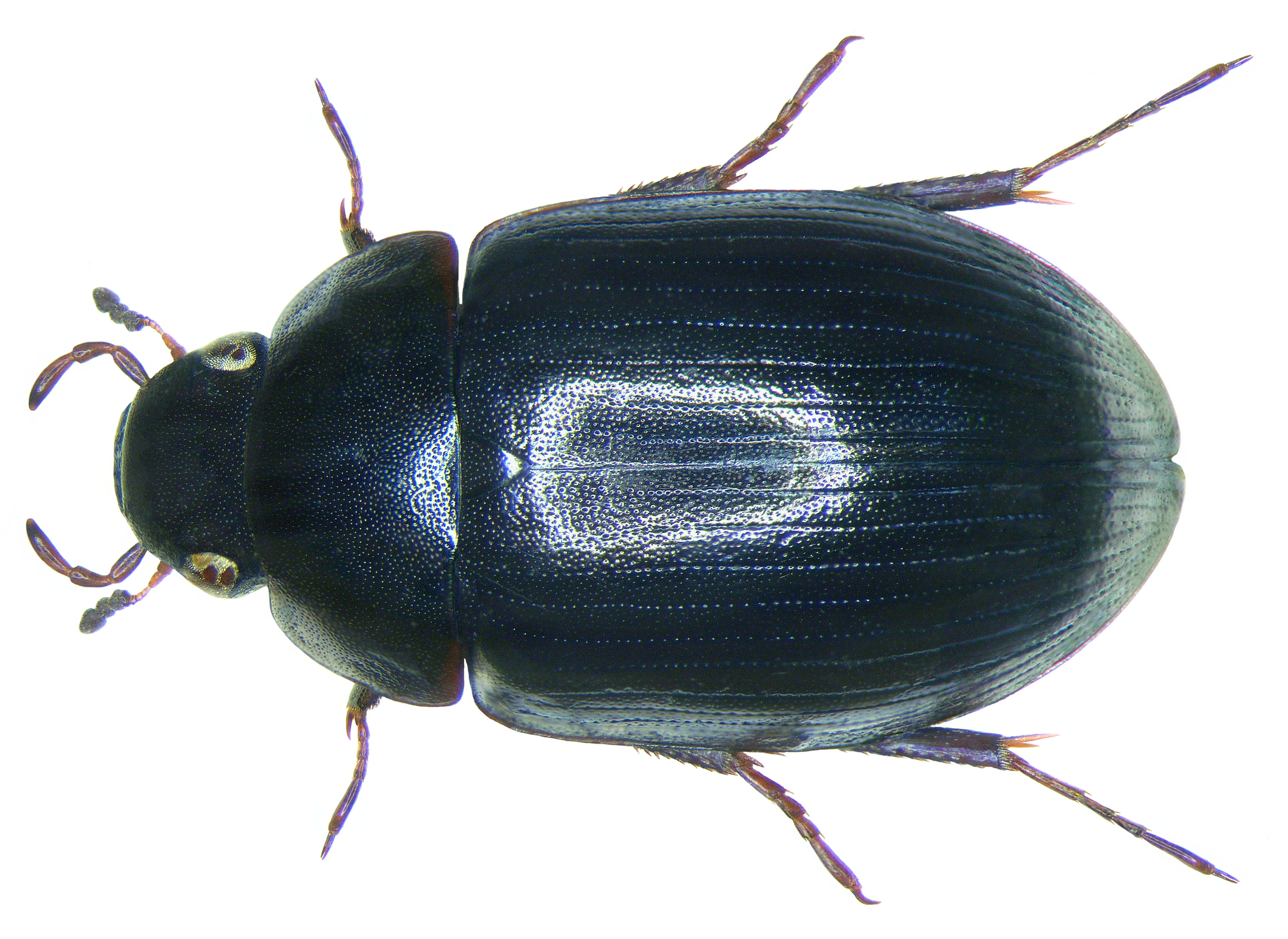
- Hydrobius fuscipes

Scientific classification
- Domain: Eukaryota
- Kingdom: Animalia
- Phylum: Arthropoda
- Class: Insecta
- Order: Coleoptera
- Suborder: Polyphaga
- Infraorder: Staphyliniformia
- Family: Hydrophilidae
- Tribe: Hydrophilini
- Genus: Hydrobius; Leach, 1815

= Hydrobius =

Genus of beetles

Hydrobius is a genus of hydrophilid beetles that contains nine species distributed throughout the Holarctic realm.

- Hydrobius arcticus Kuwert, 1890
- Hydrobius convexus Brullé, 1835
- Hydrobius fuscipes (Linnaeus, 1758)
- Hydrobius melaenus (Germar, 1824)
- Hydrobius orientalis Jia & Short, 2009
- Hydrobius pauper Sharp, 1884
- Hydrobius pui Jia, 1995
- Hydrobius punctistriatus Jia, 1995
- Hydrobius tumidus LeConte, 1835
