= Ametor =

Scientific classification
- Domain: Eukaryota
- Kingdom: Animalia
- Phylum: Arthropoda
- Class: Insecta
- Order: Coleoptera
- Suborder: Polyphaga
- Infraorder: Staphyliniformia
- Family: Hydrophilidae
- Tribe: Sperchopsini
- Genus: Ametor; Semenow, 1900

Genus of beetles

Ametor is a genus of water scavenger beetles in the family Hydrophilidae. There are at least two described species in Ametor.

== Species ==
These two species belong to the genus Ametor:

- Ametor latus (Horn, 1873)
- Ametor scabrosus (Horn, 1873)
