= Aspergillus sublatus =

Scientific classification
- Kingdom: Fungi
- Division: Ascomycota
- Class: Eurotiomycetes
- Order: Eurotiales
- Family: Aspergillaceae
- Genus: Aspergillus
- Species: A. sublatus

Binomial name
- Aspergillus sublatus Y. Horie (1979)

Synonyms
- Apsergillus latus

Species of fungus

Aspergillus sublatus (also named Apsergillus latus) is a species of fungus in the genus Aspergillus. It is from the Nidulantes section. The species was first described in 1979. It has been reported to produce asperthecin, nidulalin A, nidulalin B, and sterigmatocystin.
