= Ametor latus =

Scientific classification
- Domain: Eukaryota
- Kingdom: Animalia
- Phylum: Arthropoda
- Class: Insecta
- Order: Coleoptera
- Suborder: Polyphaga
- Infraorder: Staphyliniformia
- Family: Hydrophilidae
- Genus: Ametor
- Species: A. latus

Binomial name
- Ametor latus (Horn, 1873)

Synonyms
- Hydrobius latus Horn, 1873

Species of beetle

Ametor latus is a species of water scavenger beetle in the family Hydrophilidae. It is found in North America.
