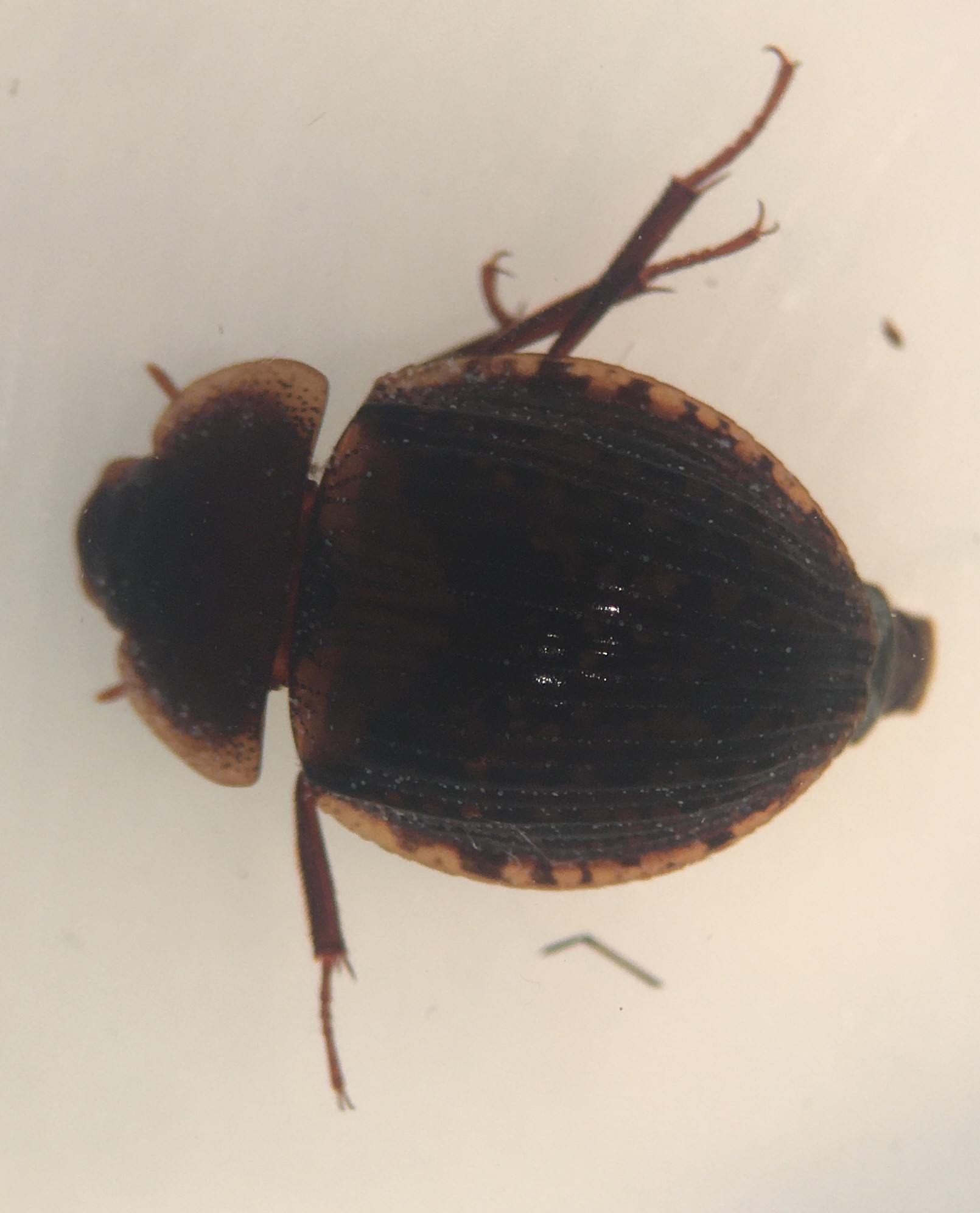

Scientific classification
- Kingdom: Animalia
- Phylum: Arthropoda
- Class: Insecta
- Order: Coleoptera
- Suborder: Polyphaga
- Infraorder: Staphyliniformia
- Family: Hydrophilidae
- Tribe: Sperchopsini
- Genus: Sperchopsis; LeConte, 1862

= Sperchopsis =

Genus of beetles

Sperchopsis is a genus of water scavenger beetles in the family Hydrophilidae. There is one described species in Sperchopsis, S. tessellata.
