= Anancylus latus =

Scientific classification
- Domain: Eukaryota
- Kingdom: Animalia
- Phylum: Arthropoda
- Class: Insecta
- Order: Coleoptera
- Suborder: Polyphaga
- Infraorder: Cucujiformia
- Family: Cerambycidae
- Genus: Anancylus
- Species: A. latus

Binomial name
- Anancylus latus Pascoe, 1865

Synonyms
- Anancylus maculosus Aurivillius, 1911

Species of beetle

Anancylus latus is a species of beetle in the family Cerambycidae. It was described by Francis Polkinghorne Pascoe in 1865. It is known from Papua New Guinea and Indonesia.
