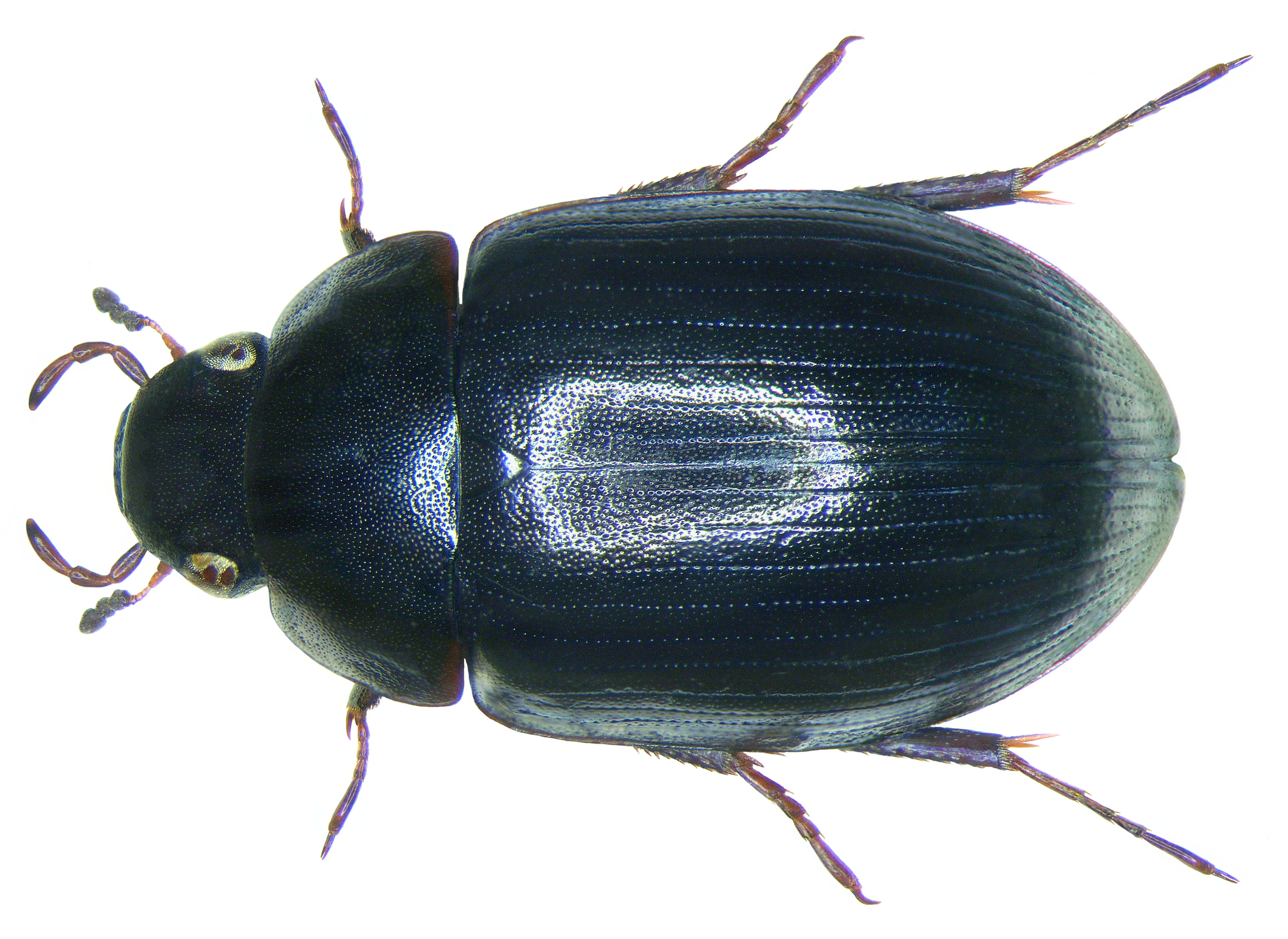

Scientific classification
- Kingdom: Animalia
- Phylum: Arthropoda
- Clade: Pancrustacea
- Class: Insecta
- Order: Coleoptera
- Suborder: Polyphaga
- Infraorder: Staphyliniformia
- Family: Hydrophilidae
- Genus: Hydrobius
- Species: H. fuscipes

Binomial name
- Hydrobius fuscipes (Linnaeus, 1758)

Synonyms
- Dytiscus fuscipes Linnaeus, 1758

= Hydrobius fuscipes =

Species of beetle

Hydrobius fuscipes is a species of beetles in the family Hydrophilidae that is found across much of the temperate Northern Hemisphere.
