= Aulotrachichthys latus =

Scientific classification
- Kingdom: Animalia
- Phylum: Chordata
- Class: Actinopterygii
- Order: Trachichthyiformes
- Family: Trachichthyidae
- Genus: Aulotrachichthys
- Species: A. latus

Binomial name
- Aulotrachichthys latus Fowler, 1938

Species of fish

Aulotrachichthys latus, the Philippine luminous roughy, is a slimehead native to the Western Pacific around Indonesia and the Philippines. It is a deep-water species, ranging from 164 to 723 metres (538 to 2,372 ft) beneath the surface.
