= Armand d'Orchymont =

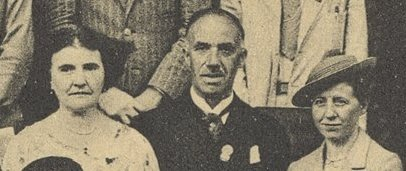
D'Orchymont with his daughter (left) and wife (right) at Madrid in 1935

Armand-Hippolyte d'Orchymont (4 March 1881 – 9 February 1947) was a Belgian tax official and amateur entomologist who specialized in the water beetles (Hydrophilidae). He described a large number of species in the group and has been called the "Father of Palpicornes" (Palpicornes being an outdated name for water beetles with elongated maxillary palps).

D'Orchymont was born in Antwerp in a Flemish family of nobility that once owned the Chateau d'Orchymont (destroyed in 1636). He worked as a tax clerk rising to the position of inspector of direct taxes in 1922. In his spare time he took an interest in insects. He took an interest in natural history collections, collecting insects from 1902 and also maintaining a herbarium. He also collected fossils and had an interest in geology. He became a member of the Entomological Society of Belgium in 1906 when he made observations on a sphecid wasp. He later spent more effort on the beetles. He then began to focus on the Hydrophilidae working with Guillaume Severin at the Royal Museum of Natural History. The two published a major work in 1911 on the genera Sternolophus, Hydrophilus and Hydrous. Collections made in Congo by Henri Schouteden were then entrusted to him for identification. This went into the Revue Zoologique Africaine. He then became widely reputed and collections of Hydrophilidae from around the world were sent to him. In 1913 he was chosen to the Internation Committee on Entomological Nomenclature as a council member. He was made secretary of the Belgian Entomological Society in 1923. In 1928 he was made curator and head of the entomology section of the Royal Museum of Natural History under the directorship of Victor van Straelen.

Several species have been named in his honour including Cycreon armandi.
