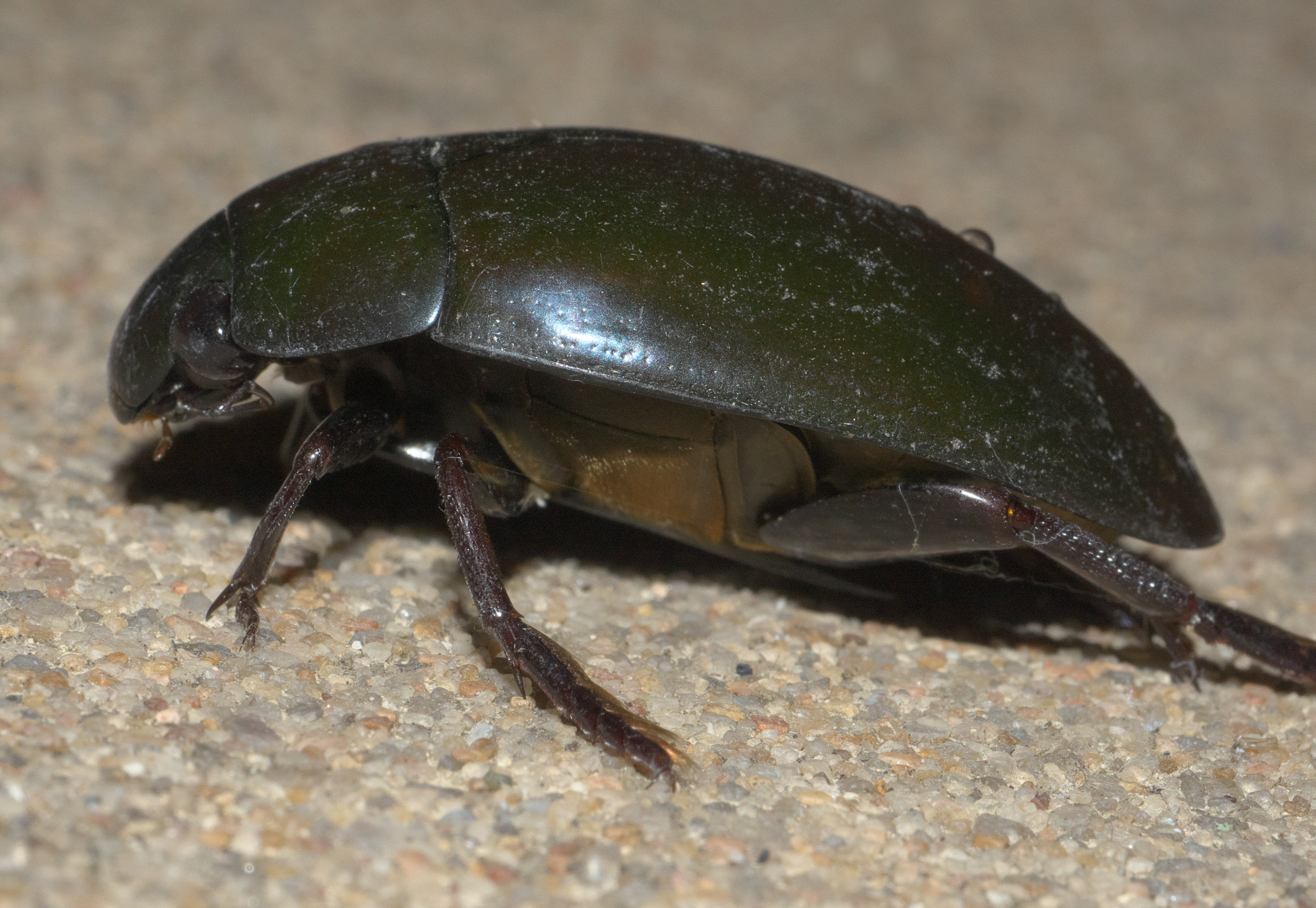
- Hydrophilus ovatus

Scientific classification
- Kingdom: Animalia
- Phylum: Arthropoda
- Class: Insecta
- Order: Coleoptera
- Suborder: Polyphaga
- Infraorder: Staphyliniformia
- Family: Hydrophilidae
- Subfamily: Hydrophilinae; Latreille, 1802

= Hydrophilinae =

Subfamily of beetles

Hydrophilinae is a subfamily of Hydrophilidae that contains five tribes in 33 genera after the classification was revised by Short and Fikáček in 2013.

== Tribes ==
Updated to Short and Fikáček (2013).

- Amphiopini
- Berosini
- Hydrobiusini
- Hydrophilini
- Laccobiini

From Short and Fikåček (2011).
