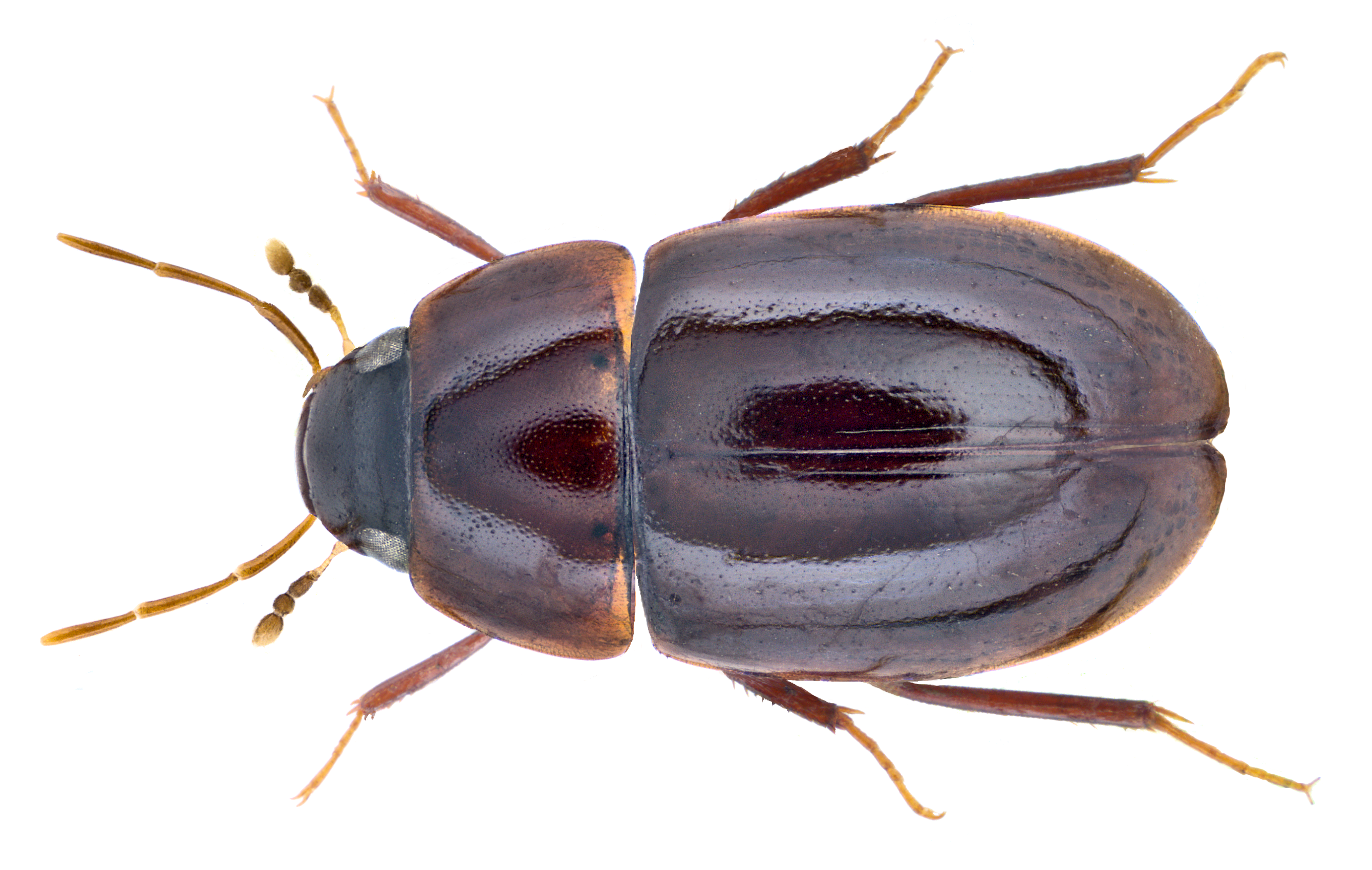
- Dorsal view of Crephelochares abnormalis

Scientific classification
- Kingdom: Animalia
- Phylum: Arthropoda
- Clade: Pancrustacea
- Class: Insecta
- Order: Coleoptera
- Suborder: Polyphaga
- Infraorder: Staphyliniformia
- Family: Hydrophilidae
- Genus: Crephelochares
- Species: C. abnormalis

Binomial name
- Crephelochares abnormalis (Sharp, 1890)

Synonyms
- Philydrus abnormalis Sharp, 1890; Helochares regimbarti Knisch, 1924; Philhydrus nigritulus Régimbart, 1903; Phylhydrus ferrugatus Régimbart, 1903; Chasmogenus abnormalis (Sharp, 1890)

= Crephelochares abnormalis =

Species of beetle

Crephelochares abnormalis, is a species of water scavenger beetle found in Cambodia, Sri Lanka, Taiwan, Thailand, Vietnam, Ryukyu Islands and Indonesia: Borneo, Java, Sulawesi, Sumatra.

== Taxonomy ==
The species was originally described by David Sharp in 1890 under the genus Philydrus.

It was transferred to the genus Chasmogenus when Chasmogenus was considered a subgenus of the genus Helochares and a synonym of Crephelochares. Additional details about the taxonomic history of Chasmogenus and Crephelochares can be found in Girón and Short (2021).

== Description ==
The species is closely related to Chasmogenus orbus, only can be separated by features of the aedeagus: parameres without or with small subapical tooth, where the apex is broadened inwards. Median lobe gradually becomes narrow from apical quarter to apex and widely truncate apically.
