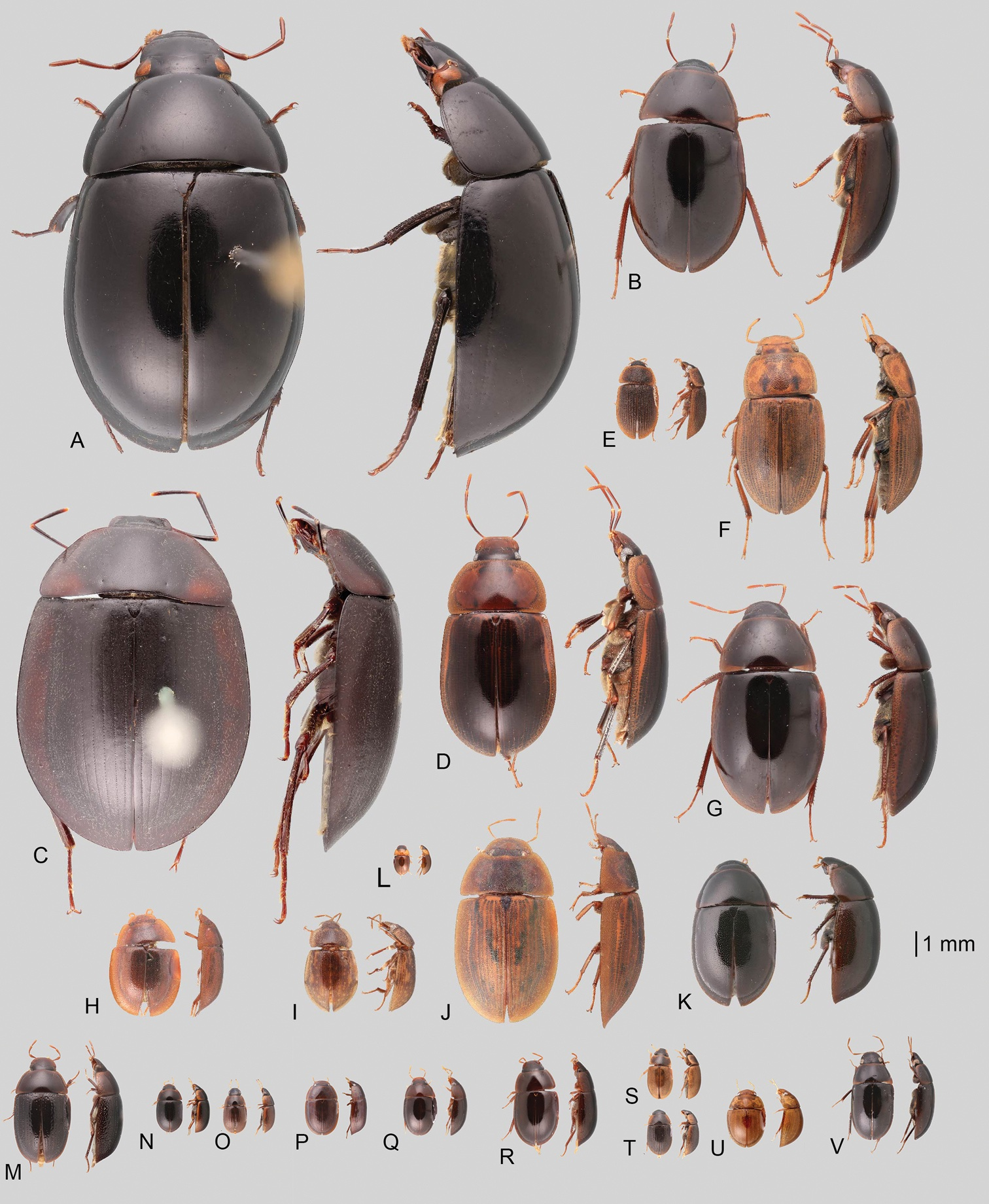
- Variation across Acidocerinae, dorsal and lateral views A Colossochares ellipticus B Peltochares sp. C Peltochares conspicuus D Aulonochares tubulus E Helochares sp. F Helochares tristis G Novochares sp. H Helopeltarium ferrugineum I Batochares sp. J Helobata larvalis K Radicitus sp. L Nanosaphes tricolor M Agraphydrus cf. attenuatus N Tobochares luteomargo O Tobochares sulcatus P Quadriops similaris Q Crucisternum ouboteri R Primocerus neutrum S Agraphydrus coomani T Agraphydrus sp. U Globulosis flavus V Crephelochares nitescens.

Scientific classification
- Kingdom: Animalia
- Phylum: Arthropoda
- Clade: Pancrustacea
- Class: Insecta
- Order: Coleoptera
- Suborder: Polyphaga
- Infraorder: Staphyliniformia
- Family: Hydrophilidae
- Subfamily: Acidocerinae; Zaitzev, 1908

= Acidocerinae =

Subfamily of beetles

Acidocerinae is a subfamily in the family Hydrophilidae of aquatic beetles, and it contains over 500 species in 23 genera.

== Taxonomy ==
Acidocerinae has been considered a subfamily since Short and Fikáček restructured the classification of the Hydrophilidae in 2013. The entire classification history of the Acidocerinae was revised by Girón and Short in 2021, based on the results of a phylogenetic analysis.

The subfamily currently contains over 500 species in 24 genera, some of which were erected in 2021.

== Description ==
According to Girón and Short:

Acidocerinae is a heterogeneous assemblage of beetles, as a variety of sizes, colorations and body shapes can be found in the group. Species range in size from 1.1 mm (Nanosaphes) to 14 mm (Colossochares) and range in color from pale yellowish and orange brown to nearly black, sometimes with a mottled appearance. Body forms vary from compact and convex (e.g., Globulosis) to broadly explanate and dorsoventrally compressed (e.g., Helobata, Helopeltarium).–

— Girón and Short, The Acidocerinae (Coleoptera, Hydrophilidae): taxonomy, classification, and catalog of species., p. 4

Additionally,

Acidocerines can be generally recognized by their oval and moderately convex body shapes with slender maxillary palps and uniformly slender tibiae (usually strongly convex and sometimes rounded in Cylominae and Sphaeridiinae, with short and stout maxillary palps and stout to apically broadened tibiae). The maxillary palps are always curved inwards in Acidocerinae (maxillary palpomere 2 with inner margin straight to concave), with palpomeres 2–4 similar in length and proportions (curved outwards, zig-zag oriented, or with shorter palpomere 3 in most Enochrinae and Chaetarthriinae). In addition, Acidocerines always bear five tarsomeres on the meso- and metatarsi (four in some enochrines).–

— Girón and Short, The Acidocerinae (Coleoptera, Hydrophilidae): taxonomy, classification, and catalog of species., p. 38

== Distribution and habitat ==
According to Girón and Short:

Acidocerines can be found in all biogeographic regions except the Antarctic. [...] The distributions [of species] can be very narrow and restricted to one or a few fairly close localities, or very broadly widespread across several continents. [...] Acidocerine species can be found across a wide variety of environments, spanning almost the full range of habitats that occur in the Hydrophilidae as a whole, including fully aquatic settings like ponds, streams, and river margins, hygropetric habitats like rock seepages, and terrestrial niches such as rotting fruits. [...] Acidocerines, as a whole, occupy one of the widest habitat breadths of any aquatic beetle group, although most individual species are fairly narrow and predictable in their ecological preferences. Consequently, collecting in a variety of habitats using multiple methods is often required to adequately survey a locality.–

— Girón and Short, The Acidocerinae (Coleoptera, Hydrophilidae): taxonomy, classification, and catalog of species.

== Genera ==
- Acidocerus Klug, 1855: 649
- Agraphydrus Régimbart, 1903: 33
- Aulonochares Girón & Short, 2019: 112
- Batochares Hansen, 1991: 292
- Chasmogenus Sharp, 1882: 73
- Colossochares Girón & Short, 2021: 55
- Crephelochares Kuwert, 1890: 38
- Crucisternum Girón & Short, 2018: 116
- Ephydrolithus Girón & Short, 2019: 122
- Globulosis García, 2001: 153
- Helobata Bergroth, 1888: 137
- Helochares Mulsant, 1844: 132
- Helopeltarium d’Orchymont, 1943: 9
- Katasophistes Girón & Short, 2018: 132
- Nanosaphes Girón & Short, 2018: 143
- Novochares Girón & Short, 2021: 87
- Peltochares Régimbart, 1907: 49
- Primocerus Girón & Short, 2019: 133
- Quadriops Hansen, 1999: 131
- Radicitus Short & García, 2014: 252
- Sindolus Sharp, 1882: 72
- Tobochares Short & García, 2007: 2
- Troglochares Spangler, 1981: 316
