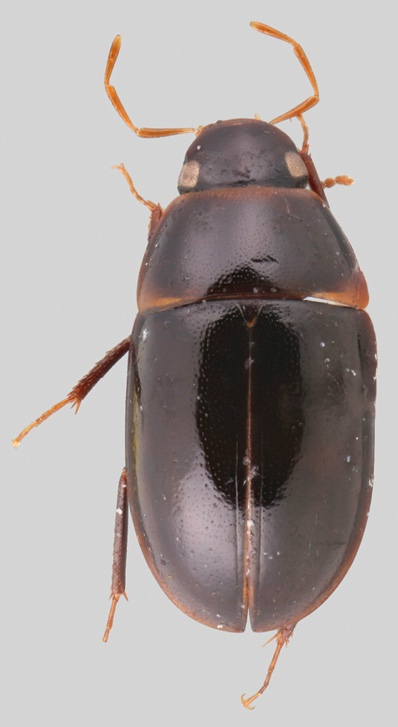
- Dorsal view of Crephelochares nitescens

Scientific classification
- Domain: Eukaryota
- Kingdom: Animalia
- Phylum: Arthropoda
- Class: Insecta
- Order: Coleoptera
- Suborder: Polyphaga
- Infraorder: Staphyliniformia
- Family: Hydrophilidae
- Subfamily: Acidocerinae
- Genus: Crephelochares; Kuwert, 1890

Diversity
- 29 species

= Crephelochares =

Genus of beetles

Crephelochares is a genus of water scavenger beetle in the family Hydrophilidae represented by 29 described species. It is distributed across the Afrotropical, Australasian, Indo-Malayan, and Palaearctic realms.

== Taxonomy ==
The genus Crephelochares was described for the first time by August Ferdinand Kuwert in 1890 as a subgenus of the genus Helochares.

Then it was considered a synonym of Chasmogenus, but thanks to the results of a phylogenetic analysis involving molecular data, both taxa are now considered distinct genera on their own right.

== Description ==
Small size (2.5–4.8 mm), bearing a clearly visible sutural stria; long maxillary palps; metafemora densely covered by hydrofuge pubescence.

A diagnosis was presented by Girón and Short.

== Species ==
1. Crephelochares abnormalis (Sharp, 1890)
2. Crephelochares africanus (d'Orchymont, 1937)
3. Crephelochares balkei (Short, 2010)
4. Crephelochares cattienus (Hebauer, 2002)
5. Crephelochares irianus (Hebauer, 2001)
6. Crephelochares larsi (Hebauer, 1995)
7. Crephelochares livornicus (Kuwert, 1890)
8. Crephelochares luctuosus (d'Orchymont, 1939)
9. Crephelochares lycetus (d'Orchymont, 1939)
10. Crephelochares mauritiensis (Balfour-Browne, 1958)
11. Crephelochares molinai (Hebauer, 1992)
12. Crephelochares mollis (Régimbart, 1903)
13. Crephelochares molluscus (Hebauer, 1992)
14. Crephelochares nitescens (Fauvel, 1883)
15. Crephelochares omissus (Hebauer, 1995)
16. Crephelochares orbus (Watanabe, 1987)
17. Crephelochares paramollis (Hebauer, 1992)
18. Crephelochares parorbus (Jia and Tang, 2018)
19. Crephelochares patrizii (Balfour-Browne, 1948)
20. Crephelochares punctulatus (Short, 2010)
21. Crephelochares rhodesiensis (Hebauer, 2006)
22. Crephelochares ruandanus (Balfour-Browne, 1957)
23. Crephelochares rubellus (Hebauer, 1992)
24. Crephelochares rubricollis (Régimbart, 1903)
25. Crephelochares rudis (Hebauer, 1992)
26. Crephelochares rusticus (d'Orchymont, 1939)
27. Crephelochares rutiloides (d'Orchymont, 1939)
28. Crephelochares rutilus (d'Orchymont, 1925)
29. Crephelochares szeli (Hebauer, 1992)
