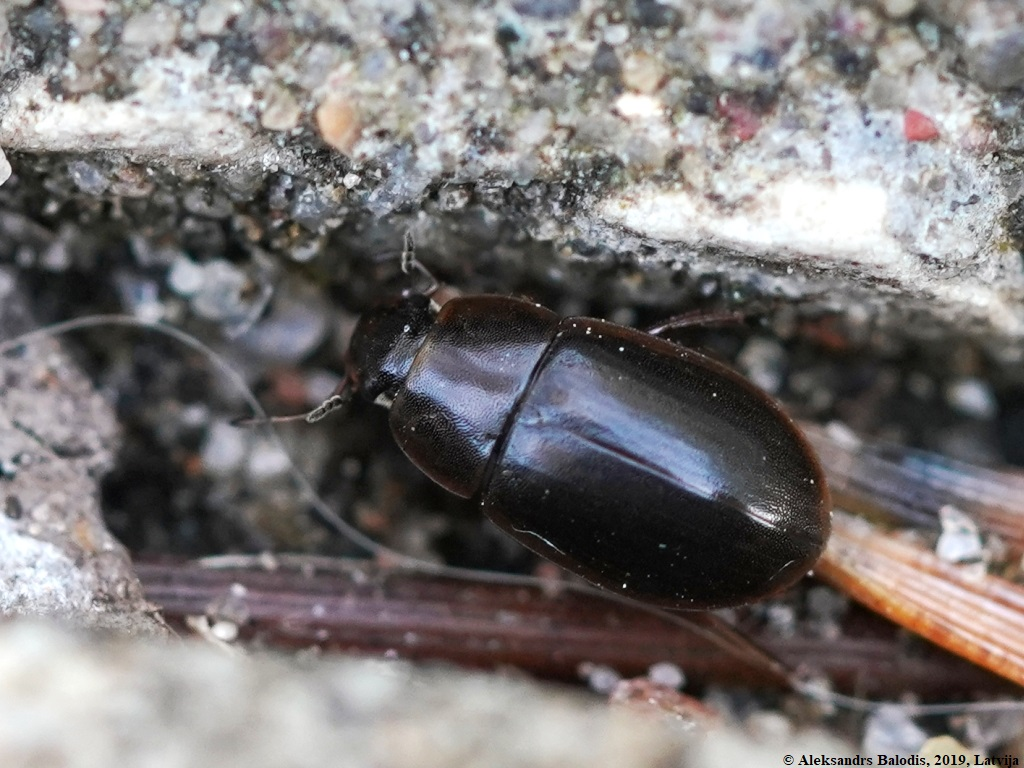

Scientific classification
- Kingdom: Animalia
- Phylum: Arthropoda
- Class: Insecta
- Order: Coleoptera
- Suborder: Polyphaga
- Infraorder: Staphyliniformia
- Family: Hydrophilidae
- Genus: Helochares
- Species: H. punctatus

Binomial name
- Helochares punctatus (Sharp, 1869)

= Helochares punctatus =

Genus of beetles

Helochares punctatus is a species of water scavenger beetles in the hydrophilid subfamily Acidocerinae. The species is native to the western Palearctic realm, where it was originally reported from western Europe (Spain to Denmark) and more recently from as far as Morocco and Iran. In the 2020s, it was reported as introduced and established in southwestern British Columbia, Canada.
