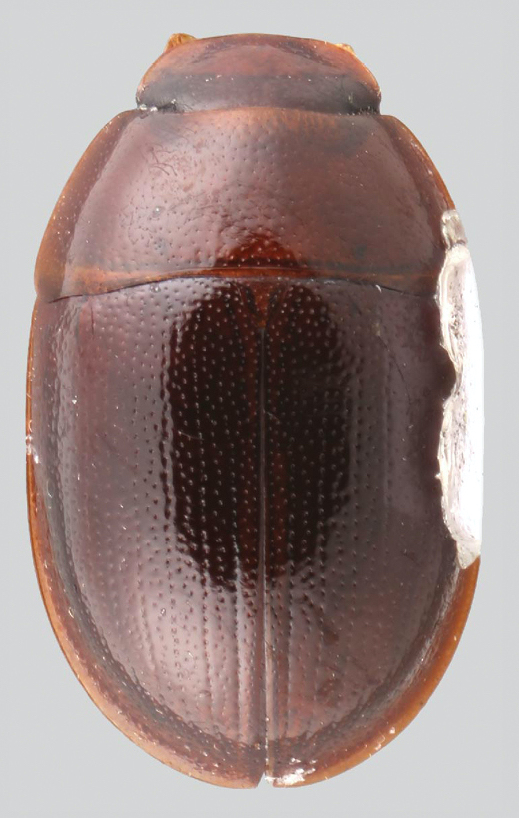
- Dorsal view of Quadriops clusia

Scientific classification
- Kingdom: Animalia
- Phylum: Arthropoda
- Class: Insecta
- Order: Coleoptera
- Suborder: Polyphaga
- Infraorder: Staphyliniformia
- Family: Hydrophilidae
- Subfamily: Acidocerinae
- Genus: Quadriops; García, 2001

= Quadriops =

Genus of beetles

Quadriops is a Neotropical genus of water scavenger beetle in the family Hydrophilidae represented by six described species.

== Taxonomy ==
The genus Quadriops was described for the first time by Michael Hansen in 1999.

It belongs in the subfamily Acidocerinae. After a revision of the genus, it now contains six described species from Brazil (Amazonas), Costa Rica, Ecuador, French Guiana, Guyana, Panama, Peru, Suriname, and Venezuela.

== Description ==
Small to tiny beetles (1.6–2.6 mm), orange brown to dark brown in coloration, with eyes fully divided in dorsal and ventral faces; short maxillary palps. The elytra are laterally explanate and the elytral punctation may present well defined elytral striae. A complete diagnosis was presented by Girón and Short.

== Habitat ==
Quadriops is the only genus of Neotropical acidocerines known only from terrestrial habitats, including rotten fruits, sap flows on freshly cut trees, and in the refuse piles of leafcutter ants.

== Species ==
These six species belong to the genus Quadriops:

1. Quadriops acroreius Girón and Short, 2017 (Suriname, French Guiana)
2. Quadriops clusia Girón and Short, 2017 (Guyana, Suriname, Brazil)
3. Quadriops dentatus Hansen, 1999 (Venezuela, Suriname, French Guiana)
4. Quadriops depressus Hansen, 1999 (Venezuela, Ecuador, Peru)
5. Quadriops reticulatus Hansen, 1999 (Costa Rica, Panama)
6. Quadriops similaris Hansen, 1999 (Venezuela, Guyana, Suriname, French Guiana, Brazil)
