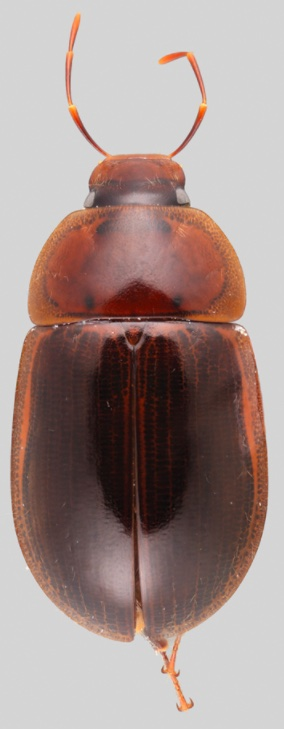
- Dorsal view of Aulonochares tubulus

Scientific classification
- Kingdom: Animalia
- Phylum: Arthropoda
- Class: Insecta
- Order: Coleoptera
- Suborder: Polyphaga
- Infraorder: Staphyliniformia
- Family: Hydrophilidae
- Subfamily: Acidocerinae
- Genus: Aulonochares; Girón & Short, 2019

Diversity
- 3 species

= Aulonochares =

Genus of beetles

Aulonochares is a Neotropical genus of water scavenger beetles in the family Hydrophilidae represented by three described species known from the Guiana Shield Region.

== Taxonomy ==
The genus Aulonochares was described for the first time by Girón & Short in 2019.

It belongs in the subfamily Acidocerinae and contains three described species from Brazil (Amazonas, Roraima), French Guiana, Guyana, Suriname, and Venezuela.

== Description ==
Medium-sized beetles (5.8–7.5 mm), smooth and shiny dorsally, orange-brown in coloration, with long maxillary palps. A complete diagnosis was presented by Girón and Short.

== Habitat ==
According to Girón and Short:

Specimens of Aulonochares have been collected in densely forested sandy streams and detrital pools in forests along creeks. They seem to prefer habitats with abundant detritus or decaying organic matter.

== Species ==
1. Aulonochares lingulatus Girón and Short, 2019
2. Aulonochares novoairensis Girón and Short, 2019
3. Aulonochares tubulus Girón and Short, 2019
