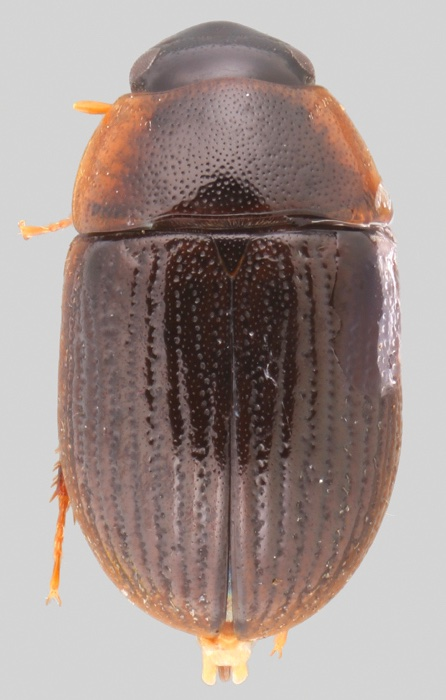
- Dorsal view of Agraphydrus sp.

Scientific classification
- Kingdom: Animalia
- Phylum: Arthropoda
- Class: Insecta
- Order: Coleoptera
- Suborder: Polyphaga
- Infraorder: Staphyliniformia
- Family: Hydrophilidae
- Subfamily: Acidocerinae
- Genus: Agraphydrus; Régimbart, 1903

Diversity
- 205 species

Synonyms
- Gymnhelochares d’Orchymont, 1932; Pseudohelochares Satô, 1960; Horelophopsis Hansen, 1997; Pseudopelthydrus Jia, 1998; Megagraphydrus Hansen, 1999

= Agraphydrus =

Genus of beetles

Agraphydrus is a genus of water scavenger beetle in the family Hydrophilidae represented by 205 recognized species. It is distributed across the Afrotropical, Australasian, and Indomalayan realms.

== Taxonomy ==
The genus Agraphydrus was described for the first time by Maurice Auguste Régimbart in 1903.

It currently contains 205 described species, partly thanks to a series revisionary work developed by Albretch Komarek.

== Description ==
Small beetles (1.4–4.8 mm), pale/yellowish to dark brown in coloration, eyes not emarginate, labrum exposed, maxillary palps moderately long. Elytra without sutural striae, not laterally explanate; the elytral punctation ranges from very fine and subtle to coarse.

A complete diagnosis was presented by Girón and Short, but also see Komarek and collaborators.

== Habitat ==
According to Girón and Short, based on annotations by Komarek and collaborators:

Agraphydrus can be found in an extremely broad range of habitats, from rivers, streams and forest pools, to hygropetric environments around waterfalls or seepages over rocks; a few species have been collected in terrestrial habitats by sifting moss and leaves from near water bodies, or in the gravel along the bank of a river; in many cases specimens have been found associated with floating vegetation, mosses and algae.

== Species ==
1. Agraphydrus abrasus Komarek and Freitag, 2020
2. Agraphydrus activus Komarek and Hebauer, 2018
3. Agraphydrus acutus Komarek, 2020
4. Agraphydrus aethiopicus Komarek, 2020
5. Agraphydrus agilis Komarek and Hebauer, 2018
6. Agraphydrus albescens (Régimbart, 1903)
7. Agraphydrus ampullatus Komarek and Freitag, 2020
8. Agraphydrus anacaenoides Komarek, 2019
9. Agraphydrus anatinus Komarek, 2018
10. Agraphydrus andamanicus Komarek, 2018
11. Agraphydrus andringitra Komarek, 2020
12. Agraphydrus angulatus Komarek, 2019
13. Agraphydrus angustatus Komarek, 2020
14. Agraphydrus angustipenis Komarek, 2018
15. Agraphydrus anhuianus (Hebauer, 2000)
16. Agraphydrus annapurnensis Komarek, 2018
17. Agraphydrus arduus Komarek and Hebauer, 2018
18. Agraphydrus ater Komarek, 2018
19. Agraphydrus atripalpis Komarek, 2020
20. Agraphydrus attenuatus (Hansen, 1999)
21. Agraphydrus audax Komarek and Hebauer, 2018
22. Agraphydrus avita (Hansen, 1997)
23. Agraphydrus bacchusi Komarek, 2019
24. Agraphydrus balkeorum Komarek, 2019
25. Agraphydrus batak Komarek and Freitag, 2020
26. Agraphydrus bhutanensis Komarek, 2018
27. Agraphydrus bicoloratus Komarek, 2020
28. Agraphydrus bilardoi Komarek, 2020
29. Agraphydrus biltoni Komarek, 2020
30. Agraphydrus biprojectus Minoshima, Komarek, and Ôhara, 2015
31. Agraphydrus borneensis Komarek, 2019
32. Agraphydrus boukali Komarek, 2018
33. Agraphydrus brevilobatus Komarek and Freitag, 2020
34. Agraphydrus brevipenis Komarek, 2019
35. Agraphydrus burmensis Komarek, 2019
36. Agraphydrus calvus Komarek and Hebauer, 2018
37. Agraphydrus camerunensis Komarek, 2020
38. Agraphydrus cantonensis Komarek and Hebauer, 2018
39. Agraphydrus carinatulus Komarek, 2019
40. Agraphydrus cervus Komarek, 2019
41. Agraphydrus ceylonensis Komarek, 2018
42. Agraphydrus chinensis Komarek and Hebauer, 2018
43. Agraphydrus cinnamum Komarek, 2018
44. Agraphydrus clarus Komarek, 2019
45. Agraphydrus comes Komarek and Hebauer, 2018
46. Agraphydrus communis Komarek, 2018
47. Agraphydrus confusus Komarek and Hebauer, 2018
48. Agraphydrus congolensis Komarek, 2020
49. Agraphydrus conicus Komarek and Hebauer, 2018
50. Agraphydrus connexus Komarek and Hebauer, 2018
51. Agraphydrus constrictus Komarek, 2018
52. Agraphydrus contractus Komarek and Hebauer, 2018
53. Agraphydrus coomani (d'Orchymont, 1927)
54. Agraphydrus coronarius Minoshima, Komarek, and Ôhara, 2015
55. Agraphydrus crassipenis Komarek, 2018
56. Agraphydrus dapengensis Yang & Jia, 2021
57. Agraphydrus decipiens Minoshima, Komarek, and Ôhara, 2015
58. Agraphydrus delineatus Komarek, 2019
59. Agraphydrus elongatus Ribera, Hernando, and Cieslak, 2019
60. Agraphydrus engkari Komarek, 2019
61. Agraphydrus excisus Komarek, 2019
62. Agraphydrus exedis (d'Orchymont, 1937)
63. Agraphydrus exiguus Komarek, 2019
64. Agraphydrus falcatus Komarek, 2018
65. Agraphydrus fasciatus Komarek and Hebauer, 2018
66. Agraphydrus fikaceki Komarek and Hebauer, 2018
67. Agraphydrus flavescens Komarek, 2020
68. Agraphydrus flavipes Komarek, 2020
69. Agraphydrus flavonotus Komarek, 2018
70. Agraphydrus floresinus Komarek, 2019
71. Agraphydrus fontis Komarek, 2020
72. Agraphydrus forcipatus Komarek and Hebauer, 2018
73. Agraphydrus fortis Komarek, 2018
74. Agraphydrus fujianensis Komarek and Hebauer, 2018
75. Agraphydrus geminus (d'Orchymont, 1932)
76. Agraphydrus gereckei Komarek, 2020
77. Agraphydrus gilvus Komarek, 2018
78. Agraphydrus glaber Komarek, 2018
79. Agraphydrus globipenis Komarek and Hebauer, 2018
80. Agraphydrus goldschmidti Komarek, 2020
81. Agraphydrus gracilipalpis Komarek, 2018
82. Agraphydrus hamatus Komarek, 2019
83. Agraphydrus hanseni (Satô and Yoshitomi, 2004)
84. Agraphydrus heinrichi Komarek, 2018
85. Agraphydrus helicopter Komarek, 2019
86. Agraphydrus hendrichi Komarek, 2019
87. Agraphydrus heterochromatus Komarek, 2019
88. Agraphydrus hortensis Komarek, 2019
89. Agraphydrus hygropetricus Komarek, 2018
90. Agraphydrus igneus Komarek and Hebauer, 2018
91. Agraphydrus imitans Komarek, 2019
92. Agraphydrus indicus (d'Orchymont, 1932)
93. Agraphydrus inflatus Komarek, 2018
94. Agraphydrus infuscatus Komarek, 2019
95. Agraphydrus insidiator Minoshima, Komarek, and Ôhara, 2015
96. Agraphydrus ishiharai (Matsui, 1994)
97. Agraphydrus jaechi (Hansen, 1999)
98. Agraphydrus jankodadai Komarek, 2019
99. Agraphydrus jilanzhui Komarek and Hebauer, 2018
100. Agraphydrus kallar Komarek, 2018
101. Agraphydrus kathapa Komarek, 2019
102. Agraphydrus kempi (d'Orchymont, 1922)
103. Agraphydrus khasiensis Komarek, 2018
104. Agraphydrus kodaguensis Komarek, 2018
105. Agraphydrus komareki Yang & Jia, 2021
106. Agraphydrus laocaiensis Komarek, 2019
107. Agraphydrus latus Komarek, 2019
108. Agraphydrus longipalpus (Jia, 1998)
109. Agraphydrus longipenis Komarek and Hebauer, 2018
110. Agraphydrus lunaris Komarek, 2019
111. Agraphydrus luteilateralis (Minoshima and Fujiwara, 2009)
112. Agraphydrus madagascarensis Komarek, 2020
113. Agraphydrus maehongsonensis Komarek, 2019
114. Agraphydrus malayanus (Hebauer, 2000)
115. Agraphydrus malkini Komarek, 2020
116. Agraphydrus manfredjaechi Komarek, 2019
117. Agraphydrus masatakai Minoshima, Komarek, and Ôhara, 2015
118. Agraphydrus matoposensis Komarek, 2020
119. Agraphydrus mazzoldii Komarek, 2019
120. Agraphydrus meghalayanus Komarek, 2018
121. Agraphydrus microphthalmus Komarek, 2019
122. Agraphydrus minutissimus (Kuwert, 1890)
123. Agraphydrus mirabilis Komarek, 2019
124. Agraphydrus montanus Minoshima, Komarek, and Ôhara, 2015
125. Agraphydrus muluensis Komarek, 2019
126. Agraphydrus musculus Komarek, 2019
127. Agraphydrus namthaensis Komarek, 2019
128. Agraphydrus nanus Komarek, 2018
129. Agraphydrus narusei (Satô, 1960)
130. Agraphydrus nemorosus Komarek, 2019
131. Agraphydrus nepalensis Komarek, 2018
132. Agraphydrus niger Komarek, 2018
133. Agraphydrus nigroflavus Komarek, 2019
134. Agraphydrus obesus Komarek, 2019
135. Agraphydrus obscuratus Komarek, 2018
136. Agraphydrus obsoletus Komarek, 2018
137. Agraphydrus occultus Komarek and Freitag, 2020
138. Agraphydrus ogatai Minoshima, 2016
139. Agraphydrus orbicularis Komarek, 2019
140. Agraphydrus orientalis (d'Orchymont, 1932)
141. Agraphydrus palawanensis Komarek and Freitag, 2020
142. Agraphydrus pallidus Komarek, 2019
143. Agraphydrus papuanus Komarek, 2019
144. Agraphydrus pauculus (Knisch, 1924)
145. Agraphydrus pauper Komarek, 2020
146. Agraphydrus pelingeni Komarek and Freitag, 2020
147. Agraphydrus penangensis Komarek, 2019
148. Agraphydrus piceus Komarek, 2019
149. Agraphydrus politus (Hansen, 1999)
150. Agraphydrus praecipuus (d'Orchymont, 1937)
151. Agraphydrus protentus Komarek, 2018
152. Agraphydrus pseudoniger Yang & Jia, 2021
153. Agraphydrus pullus Komarek, 2018
154. Agraphydrus punctatellus Régimbart, 1903
155. Agraphydrus punctulatus Komarek, 2018
156. Agraphydrus puzhelongi (Jia, 2010)
157. Agraphydrus pygmaeus (Knisch, 1924)
158. Agraphydrus raucus Komarek, 2019
159. Agraphydrus reductus Komarek and Hebauer, 2018
160. Agraphydrus regularis (Hansen, 1999)
161. Agraphydrus reticulatus Komarek, 2019
162. Agraphydrus reticuliceps Komarek and Hebauer, 2018
163. Agraphydrus rhodesiensis Komarek, 2020
164. Agraphydrus rhomboideus Komarek, 2019
165. Agraphydrus rivalis Komarek, 2020
166. Agraphydrus robustus Komarek and Hebauer, 2018
167. Agraphydrus rostratus Komarek, 2018
168. Agraphydrus rugosus Komarek, 2018
169. Agraphydrus sabulosus Yang & Jia, 2021
170. Agraphydrus sarawakensis Komarek, 2019
171. Agraphydrus schoedli Komarek, 2019
172. Agraphydrus schoenmanni Komarek and Hebauer, 2018
173. Agraphydrus scintillans Komarek, 2019
174. Agraphydrus scutifer Komarek, 2020
175. Agraphydrus setifer Komarek and Hebauer, 2018
176. Agraphydrus shaverdoae Komarek, 2019
177. Agraphydrus siamensis (Hansen, 1999)
178. Agraphydrus sipekorum Komarek, 2018
179. Agraphydrus skalei Komarek, 2019
180. Agraphydrus spadix Komarek, 2019
181. Agraphydrus spinosus Komarek, 2019
182. Agraphydrus splendens Komarek and Hebauer, 2018
183. Agraphydrus stagnalis (d'Orchymont, 1937)
184. Agraphydrus stramineus Komarek, 2019
185. Agraphydrus sucineus Komarek, 2019
186. Agraphydrus sundaicus Komarek, 2019
187. Agraphydrus tamdao Komarek, 2019
188. Agraphydrus taprobanensis Komarek, 2018
189. Agraphydrus tenuipalpis Komarek and Freitag, 2020
190. Agraphydrus thaiensis Minoshima, Komarek, and Ôhara, 2015
191. Agraphydrus tristis Komarek, 2019
192. Agraphydrus tulipa Komarek, 2019
193. Agraphydrus tumidus Komarek, 2020
194. Agraphydrus tumulosus Komarek, 2018
195. Agraphydrus umbrosus Komarek and Hebauer, 2018
196. Agraphydrus uncinatus Komarek and Hebauer, 2018
197. Agraphydrus usambaraensis Komarek, 2020
198. Agraphydrus uvaensis (Hebauer, 2000)
199. Agraphydrus vadoni Komarek, 2020
200. Agraphydrus variabilis Komarek and Hebauer, 2018
201. Agraphydrus vietnamensis Komarek, 2019
202. Agraphydrus villiersi (Balfour-Browne, 1958)
203. Agraphydrus wangmiaoi Komarek and Hebauer, 2018
204. Agraphydrus yunnanensis Komarek and Hebauer, 2018
205. Agraphydrus zetteli Komarek and Freitag, 2020
