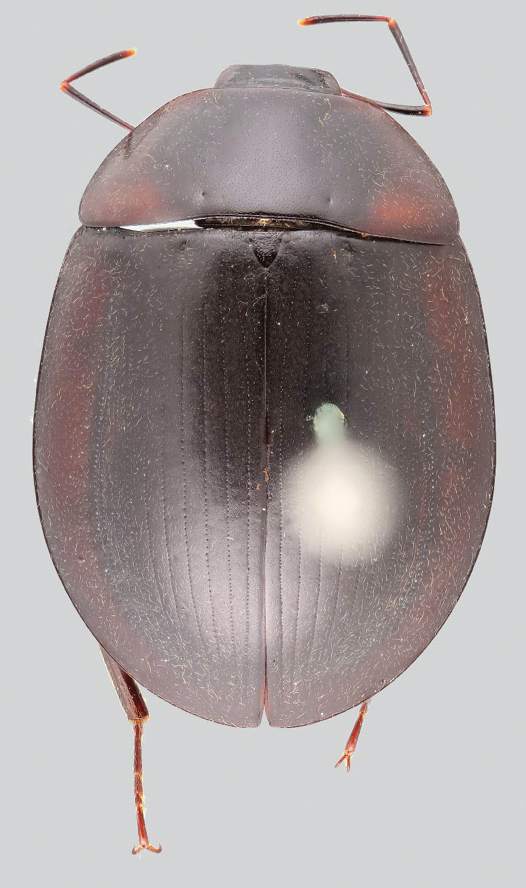
- Dorsal view of Peltochares conspicuus

Scientific classification
- Domain: Eukaryota
- Kingdom: Animalia
- Phylum: Arthropoda
- Class: Insecta
- Order: Coleoptera
- Suborder: Polyphaga
- Infraorder: Staphyliniformia
- Family: Hydrophilidae
- Subfamily: Acidocerinae
- Genus: Peltochares; Hansen, 1991

Diversity
- 8 species

= Peltochares =

Genus of beetles

Peltochares is a genus of water scavenger beetles in the family Hydrophilidae represented by eight described species. It is distributed across the Afrotropical, Australasian, Indo-Malayan, and Palaearctic realms.

== Taxonomy ==
The genus Peltochares was described for the first time by Maurice Auguste Régimbart in 1907 for a single, large, and morphologically unusual species from Gabon (Peltochares conspicuus).

Thanks to the result of a molecular-based phylogenetic analysis, along with dissections of the male genitalia, several species formerly placed in the genus Helochares were confirmed to belong in the same genus as that large and morphologically unusual species.

== Description ==
Medium-sized to relatively large beetles (6–14 mm), weakly to moderately convex in lateral view, dark brown in coloration. A diagnosis of the genus as currently circumscribed was presented by Girón and Short.

== Species ==
1. Peltochares atropiceus (Régimbart, 1903)
2. Peltochares ciniensis (Hebauer, Hendrich, and Balke, 1999)
3. Peltochares conspicuus Régimbart, 1907
4. Peltochares discus (Hebauer, Hendrich, and Balke, 1999)
5. Peltochares foveicollis (Montrouzier, 1860)
6. Peltochares longipalpis (Murray, 1859)
7. Peltochares papuensis (Hebauer, 1995)
8. Peltochares taprobanicus (Sharp, 1890)
