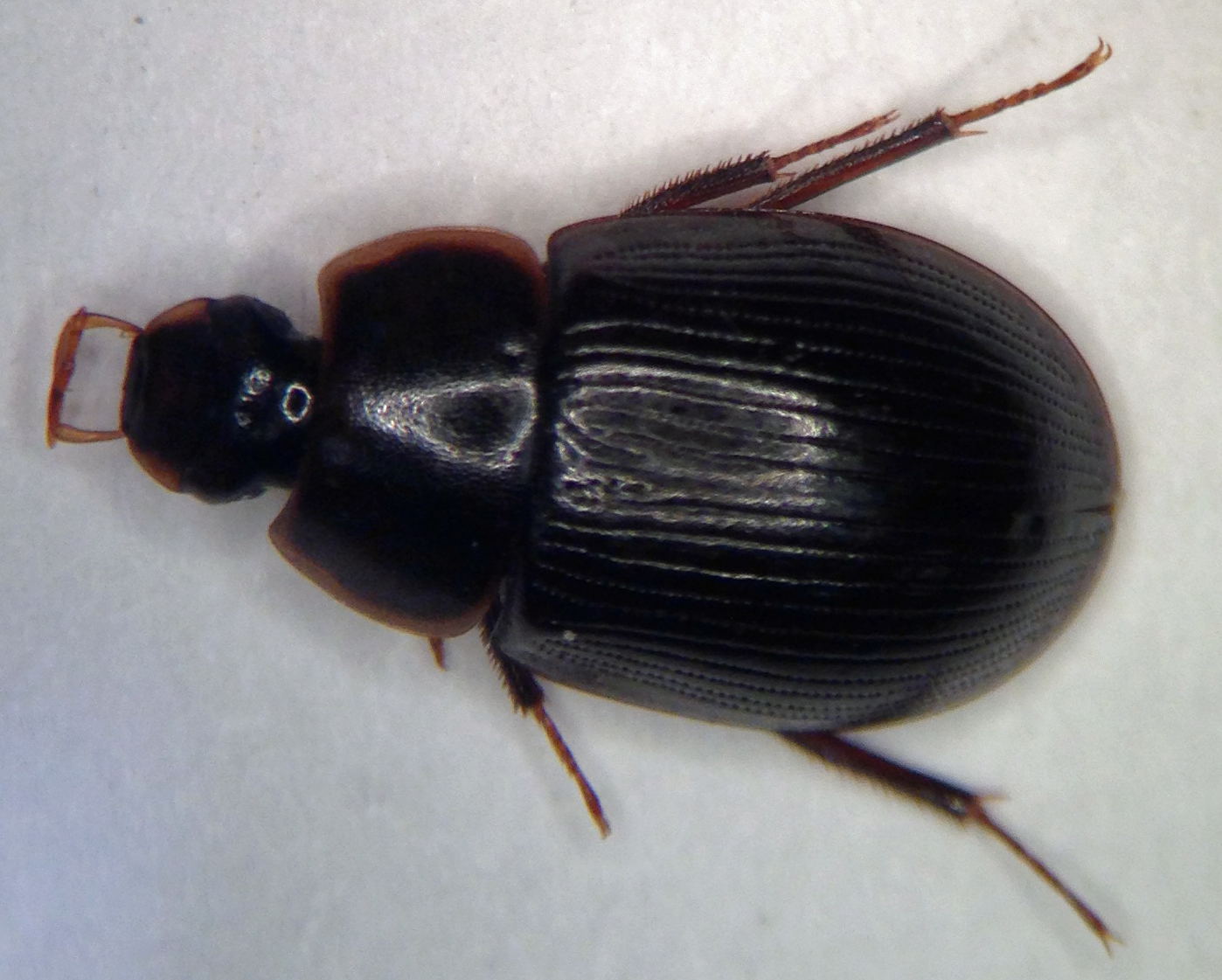

Scientific classification
- Domain: Eukaryota
- Kingdom: Animalia
- Phylum: Arthropoda
- Class: Insecta
- Order: Coleoptera
- Suborder: Polyphaga
- Infraorder: Staphyliniformia
- Family: Hydrophilidae
- Genus: Helochares
- Species: H. maculicollis

Binomial name
- Helochares maculicollis Mulsant, 1844

Synonyms
- Helochares bipunctatus Sharp, 1882

= Helochares maculicollis =

Species of beetle

Helochares maculicollis is a species of water scavenger beetle in the family Hydrophilidae. It is found in North America.
