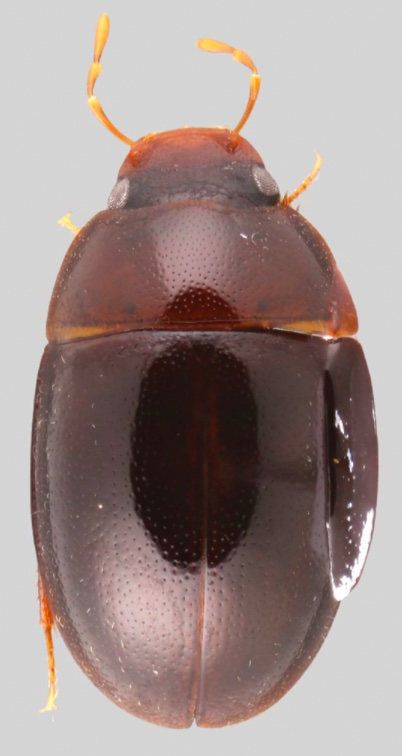
- Dorsal view of Crucisternum ouboteri

Scientific classification
- Kingdom: Animalia
- Phylum: Arthropoda
- Class: Insecta
- Order: Coleoptera
- Suborder: Polyphaga
- Infraorder: Staphyliniformia
- Family: Hydrophilidae
- Subfamily: Acidocerinae
- Genus: Crucisternum; Girón & Short, 2018

Diversity
- 7 species

= Crucisternum =

Genus of beetles

Crucisternum is a Neotropical genus of water scavenger beetles in the family Hydrophilidae represented by seven described species known from the Guiana Shield Region.

== Taxonomy ==
The genus Crucisternum was described for the first time by Girón & Short in 2018.

It belongs in the subfamily Acidocerinae and contains seven described species from Brazil (Minas Gerais, Pará), French Guiana, Guyana, Suriname, and Venezuela.

== Description ==
Small beetles (2.0–2.5 mm), smooth and shiny dorsally, orange-brown to dark brown in coloration, with long maxillary palps. The most salient characteristic of the genus is the presence of a longitudinal carina on the prosternum, which is accompanied by a cruciform elevation on the mesoventrite. A complete diagnosis was presented by Girón and Short.

== Habitat ==
According to Girón and Short "all species of the genus are associated with forested streams, usually along margins that contain ample detritus".

== Species ==
1. Crucisternum escalera Girón and Short, 2018
2. Crucisternum ouboteri Girón and Short, 2018
3. Crucisternum queneyi Girón and Short, 2018
4. Crucisternum sinuatus Girón and Short, 2018
5. Crucisternum toboganensis Girón and Short, 2018
6. Crucisternum vanessae Girón and Short, 2018
7. Crucisternum xingu Girón and Short, 2018
