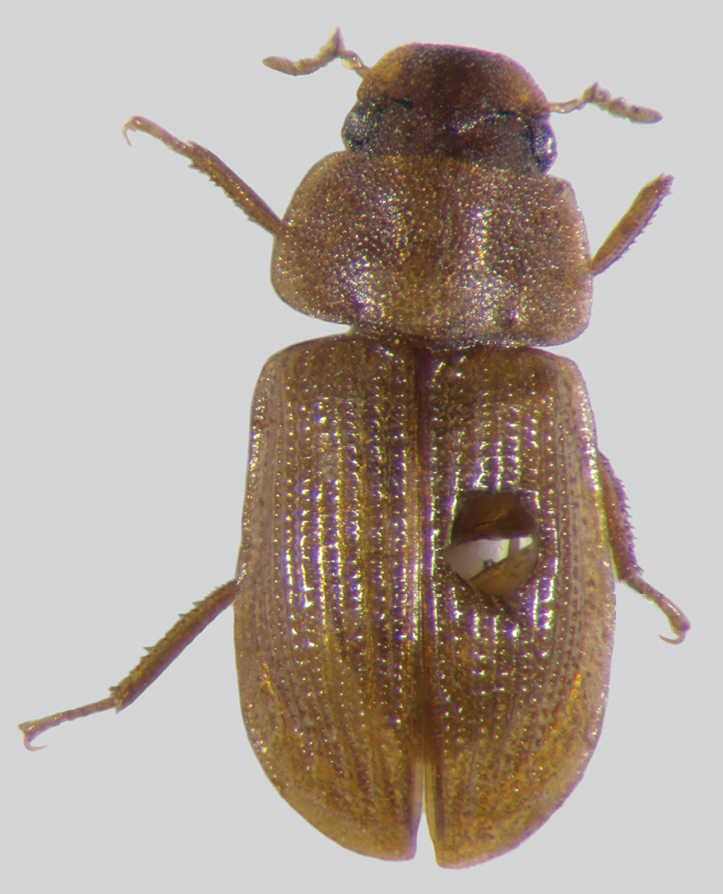
- Dorsal view of Acidocerus aphodioides

Scientific classification
- Kingdom: Animalia
- Phylum: Arthropoda
- Class: Insecta
- Order: Coleoptera
- Suborder: Polyphaga
- Infraorder: Staphyliniformia
- Family: Hydrophilidae
- Subfamily: Acidocerinae
- Genus: Acidocerus; Klug, 1855
- Species: A. aphodioides

Binomial name
- Acidocerus aphodioides Klug, 1855

= Acidocerus =

Genus of beetles

Acidocerus aphodioides is a species of water scavenger beetle in the family Hydrophilidae. It is the only species in the genus Acidocerus. It is known only from Mozambique.

== Taxonomy ==
The genus Acidocerus was described for the first time by Klug in 1855, containing only one species. It is the genus that is the basis of the name for the subfamily Acidocerinae.

== Description ==
A diagnosis was presented by Girón and Short:

Small beetles, body length nearly 2.8 mm. Body shape elongate oval in dorsal view, moderately convex in lateral view, with dorsal outline nearly straight along anterior 2/3 of elytra. Surface of head and pronotum granulate. Body pale/yellowish brown, with head slightly darker. Eyes with anterior margin straight in lateral view (not emarginate), in dorsal view slightly projecting from outline of head. Labrum not concealed by clypeus. Antennae with nine antennomeres, with strongly asymmetric cupule, with longer side acute. Maxillary palps elongate, with palpomere 4 nearly as long as palpomere 3. Elytra without sutural striae, narrowly explanate laterally, serial punctures strongly marked, arranged in rows. Prosternum flat, rather sharply carinate medially, with angulate anteromedian projection. Posterior elevation of mesoventrite only weakly bulging. Metaventrite with hydrofuge pubescence. Metafemora without distinct tibial grooves, mostly pubescent, only glabrous at apex. Metatarsomeres 1–4 similar in length; metatarsomere 5 similar in length to metatarsomeres 1–4 combined. Fifth abdominal ventrite apically emarginate, with stout setae.–

— Girón and Short, The Acidocerinae (Coleoptera, Hydrophilidae): taxonomy, classification, and catalog of species.

Some of these diagnostic features were offered by d'Orchymont in a key.
