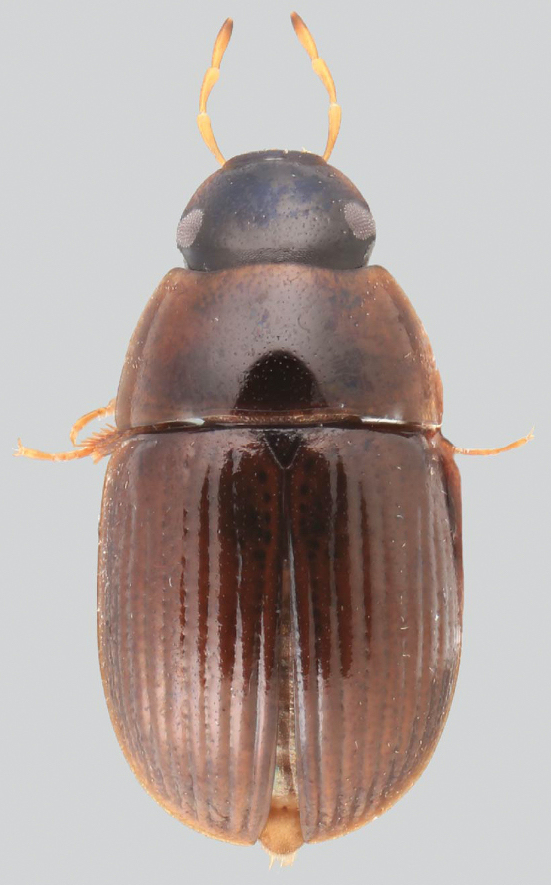
- Dorsal view of Tobochares sulcatus

Scientific classification
- Kingdom: Animalia
- Phylum: Arthropoda
- Class: Insecta
- Order: Coleoptera
- Suborder: Polyphaga
- Infraorder: Staphyliniformia
- Family: Hydrophilidae
- Subfamily: Acidocerinae
- Genus: Tobochares; Short & García, 2007

Diversity
- 24 species to 2021

= Tobochares =

Genus of beetles

Tobochares is a Neotropical genus of water scavenger beetles in the family Hydrophilidae represented by 24 described species known from the Guiana Shield Region.

== Taxonomy ==
The genus Tobochares belongs in the subfamily Acidocerinae. It was first described by Short and García in 2007. Since then, as more species are discovered in the seepages of the Guiana Shield Region, there have been two additional papers describing several additional species.

== Description ==
Small beetles (1.5–2.6 mm), yellowish brown, orange brown to dark brown in coloration; eyes entire to emarginate; maxillary palps from short and slender to very short and stout. The elytral punctation and sculpture is highly variable in this genus. There is also variation in the shape of the male genitalia and wing development. A complete diagnosis was presented by Girón and Short.

== Habitat ==
Most Tobochares are considered seepage specialists. One species (Tobochares fusus) has been also collected in rotten fruits away from water sources.

== Species ==
1. Tobochares akoerio Girón and Short, 2021: Suriname
2. Tobochares arawak Girón and Short, 2021: Guyana
3. Tobochares anthonyae Girón and Short, 2021: Venezuela
4. Tobochares atures Girón and Short, 2021: Venezuela
5. Tobochares benettii Girón and Short, 2021: Brazil (Amazonas)
6. Tobochares canaima Girón and Short, 2021: Venezuela
7. Tobochares canaliculatus Kohlenberg and Short, 2017: Venezuela
8. Tobochares canthus Kohlenberg and Short, 2017: Venezuela
9. Tobochares communis Girón and Short, 2021: Brazil (Amapá, Roraima), Guyana, Suriname, Venezuela
10. Tobochares emarginatus Kohlenberg and Short, 2017: Suriname
11. Tobochares fusus Girón and Short, 2021: Brazil (Amapá), French Guiana
12. Tobochares goias Girón and Short, 2021: Brazil (Goiás)
13. Tobochares kappel Girón and Short, 2021: Suriname
14. Tobochares kasikasima Short, 2013: Suriname
15. Tobochares kolokoe Girón and Short, 2021: Suriname
16. Tobochares kusad Kohlenberg and Short, 2017: Brazil (Roraima), Guyana
17. Tobochares luteomargo Girón and Short, 2021: Venezuela
18. Tobochares microps Girón and Short, 2021: Suriname
19. Tobochares pallidus Kohlenberg and Short, 2017: Venezuela
20. Tobochares pemon Girón and Short, 2021: Venezuela
21. Tobochares romanoae Kohlenberg and Short, 2017: Brazil (Roraima)
22. Tobochares sipaliwini Short and Kadosoe, 2011: Brazil (Roraima), Guyana, Suriname
23. Tobochares striatus Short, 2013: Suriname
24. Tobochares sulcatus Short and García, 2007: Venezuela
