= Helochares obscurus =

Scientific classification
- Domain: Eukaryota
- Kingdom: Animalia
- Phylum: Arthropoda
- Class: Insecta
- Order: Coleoptera
- Suborder: Polyphaga
- Infraorder: Staphyliniformia
- Family: Hydrophilidae
- Subfamily: Hydrophilinae
- Tribe: Hydrophilini
- Genus: Helochares
- Species: H. obscurus

Binomial name
- Helochares obscurus (O. F. Muller, 1776)

Synonyms
- Hydrophilus obscurus O. F. Muller, 1776; Helochares subcompressus Rey, 1885; Hydrophilus variegatus Herbst, 1797; Hydrophilus erythrocephalus Fabricius, 1792; Helochares substriatus Sahlberg, 1903

Species of beetle

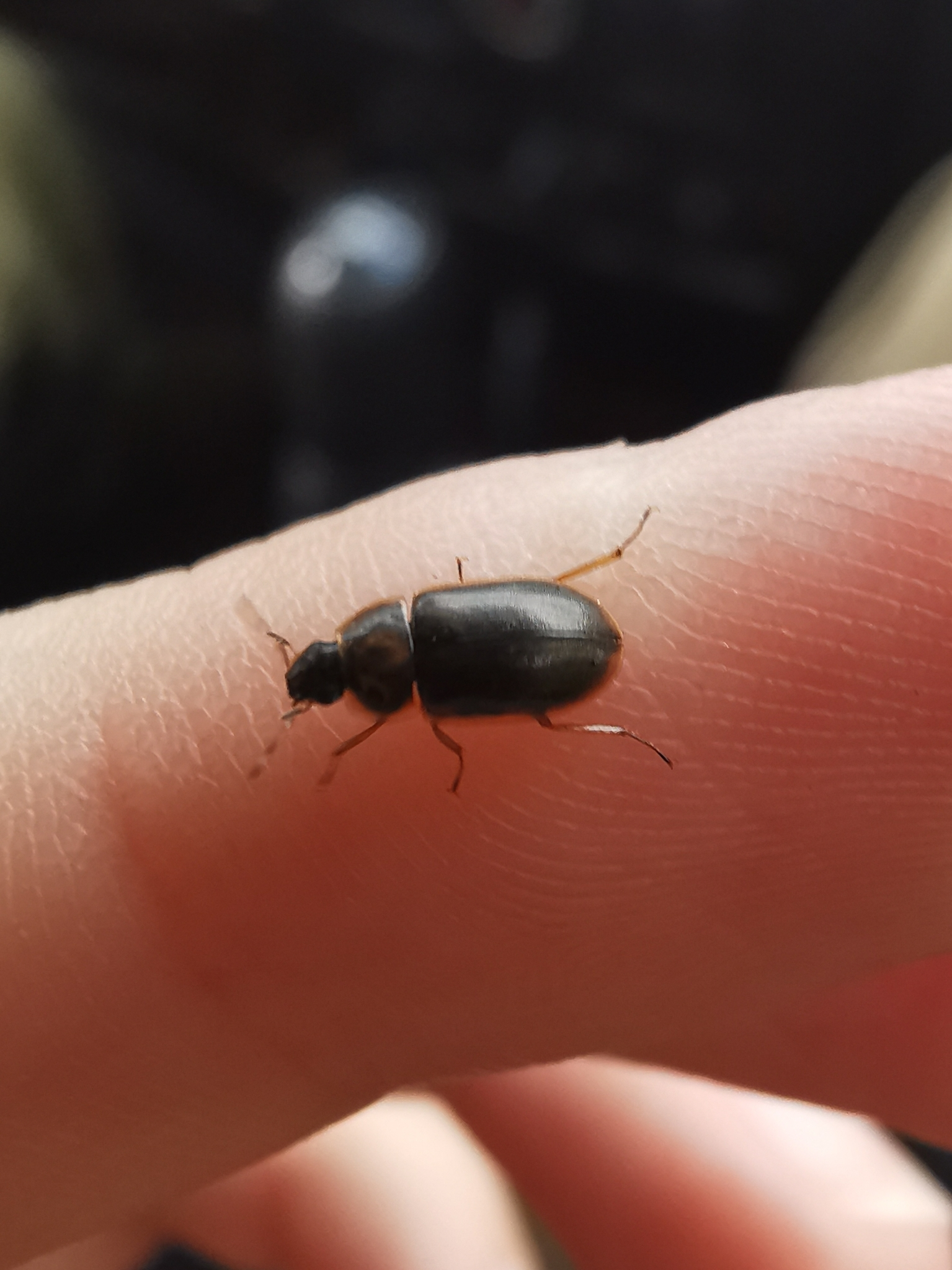
Helochares obscurus

Helochares obscurus is a species of Hydrophilidae in the Hydrophilinae subfamily that can be found in Austria, Baltic states, Croatia, France, Germany, Great Britain including the Isle of Man, Greece, Hungary, Italy, Poland, Scandinavia, Switzerland, and the Netherlands.
