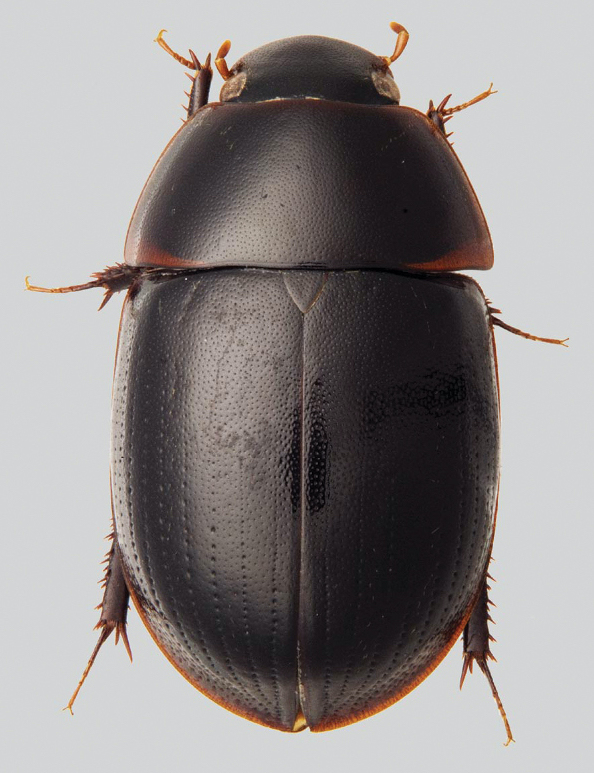
- Dorsal view of Radicitus ayacucho

Scientific classification
- Kingdom: Animalia
- Phylum: Arthropoda
- Class: Insecta
- Order: Coleoptera
- Suborder: Polyphaga
- Infraorder: Staphyliniformia
- Family: Hydrophilidae
- Subfamily: Acidocerinae
- Genus: Radicitus; Short & García, 2014

Diversity
- 3 species

= Radicitus =

Genus of beetles

Radicitus is a Neotropical genus of water scavenger beetle in the family Hydrophilidae represented by three described species known from the Guiana Shield Region.

== Taxonomy ==
The genus Radicitus was described for the first time by Short & García in 2014.

It belongs in the subfamily Acidocerinae and contains three described species from Guyana, Suriname, and Venezuela.

== Description ==
Medium-sized beetles (4.5–6.2 mm), moderate to strongly convex in lateral view, dark brown in coloration, with short and stout maxillary palps; reduced hydrofuge pubescence on metafemora. The elytral punctation may present well defined rows of serial punctures. A complete diagnosis was presented by Girón and Short.

== Habitat ==
Species of Radicitus have been found on a variety of habitats associated with streams and seeps on rock outcrops.

== Species ==
1. Radicitus ayacucho Short and García, 2014: Venezuela
2. Radicitus granitum Short and García, 2014: Venezuela
3. Radicitus surinamensis Short and García, 2014: Suriname
