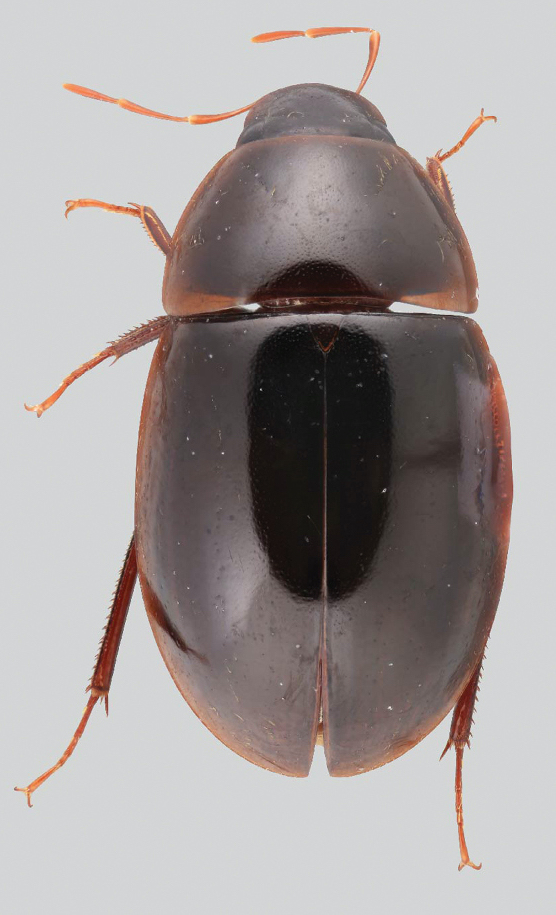
- Dorsal view of Novochares sallaei

Scientific classification
- Kingdom: Animalia
- Phylum: Arthropoda
- Class: Insecta
- Order: Coleoptera
- Suborder: Polyphaga
- Infraorder: Staphyliniformia
- Family: Hydrophilidae
- Subfamily: Acidocerinae
- Genus: Novochares; Girón & Short, 2018

Diversity
- 15 species

= Novochares =

Genus of beetles

Novochares is a primarily Neotropical genus of water scavenger beetles in the family Hydrophilidae represented by 15 described species, one of which is thought to be introduced in Florida in the United States of America.

== Taxonomy ==
The genus Novochares was created by Girón & Short in 2021 to accommodate 15 species formerly placed in the genus Helochares that occur across Central and South America, and some of the Lesser Antilles.

It belongs in the subfamily Acidocerinae.

== Description ==
Medium-sized beetles (4.5–9.0 mm), smooth and shiny dorsally, brown to dark brown in coloration, with long maxillary palps. There is a lot of variation in aedeagal forms (see Figure 43 in Girón and Short 2021). A complete diagnosis was presented by Girón and Short.

== Habitat ==
According to Girón and Short, "Species of Novochares occur in a broad range of both lentic and lotic habitats".

== Species ==
1. Novochares abbreviatus (Fabricius, 1801): Argentina, Bolivia, Brazil (Espírito Santo, Pernambuco, Piauí), Colombia, Costa Rica, Cuba, French Guiana, Lesser Antilles, Panama, Paraguay, Suriname, Venezuela.
2. Novochares atlanticus (Clarkson and Ferreira-Jr., 2014): Brazil (Rio de Janeiro, São Paulo)
3. Novochares atratus (Bruch, 1915): Argentina, Brazil (Mato Grosso do Sul, Minas Gerais), Colombia, Ecuador [in doubt]; Paraguay.
4. Novochares bolivianus (Fernández, 1989): Bolivia
5. Novochares carmona (Short, 2005): Costa Rica
6. Novochares chaquensis (Fernández, 1982): Argentina, Brazil (Mato Grosso do Sul)
7. Novochares cochlearis (Fernández, 1982): Argentina, Paraguay
8. Novochares coya (Fernández, 1982): Bolivia
9. Novochares guadelupensis (d'Orchymont, 1926): Guadeloupe
10. Novochares inornatus (d'Orchymont, 1926): Brazil (Amazonas, São Paulo), French Guiana, Guyana
11. Novochares oculatus (Sharp, 1882): Argentina, Brazil (Mato Grosso do Sul, Pernambuco, Rio de Janeiro), Costa Rica, Guatemala, Panama; [In doubt: Mexico, Grenada, Saint Vincent]
12. Novochares pallipes (Brullé, 1841): Argentina, Brazil (Mato Grosso do Sul, Minas Gerais), Paraguay, Uruguay
13. Novochares pichilingue (Fernández, 1989): Ecuador
14. Novochares sallaei (Sharp, 1882): U.S.A. (Florida). Belize, Costa Rica, Mexico
15. Novochares tectiformis (Fernández, 1982): Argentina, Brazil (Mato Grosso do Sul, Piauí), Paraguay, Venezuela
