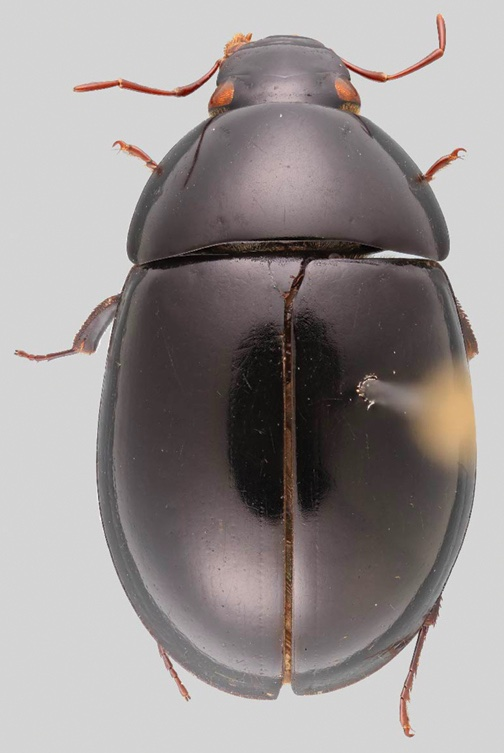
- Dorsal view of Colossochares ellipticus

Scientific classification
- Domain: Eukaryota
- Kingdom: Animalia
- Phylum: Arthropoda
- Class: Insecta
- Order: Coleoptera
- Suborder: Polyphaga
- Infraorder: Staphyliniformia
- Family: Hydrophilidae
- Subfamily: Acidocerinae
- Genus: Colossochares; Hansen, 1991

Diversity
- 2 species

= Colossochares =

Genus of beetles

Colossochares is an Afrotropical genus of water scavenger beetles in the family Hydrophilidae represented by two described species.

== Taxonomy ==
The genus Colossochares was created in 2021 to group two species of Afrotropical water scavenger beetles in the subfamily Acidocerinae that were formerly placed in the genus Helochares.

Evidence for separating these species from Helochares and constituting a new genus was provided by molecular data.

== Description ==
Relatively large beetles (8.5–14.0 mm), dark brown in coloration, very convex in lateral view. A diagnosis of the genus was presented by Girón and Short.

== Species ==
1. Colossochares ellipticus (d'Orchymont, 1933)
2. Colossochares satoi (Hebauer, 2003)
