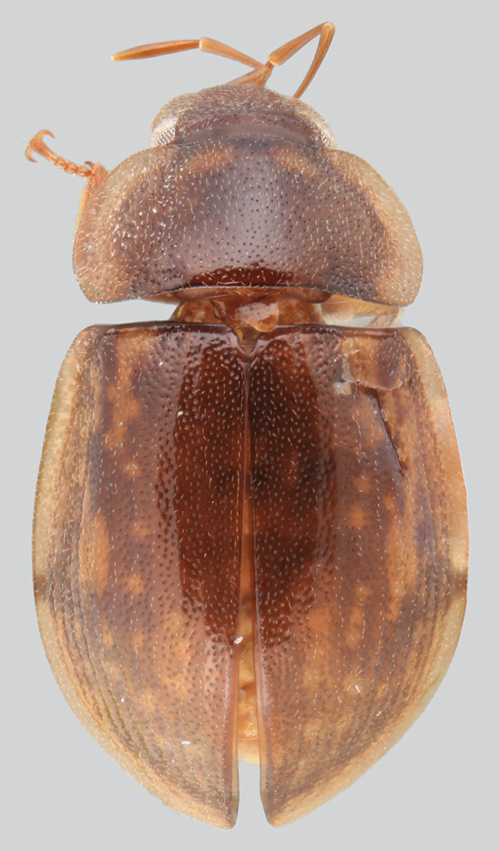
- Dorsal view of Batochares sp.

Scientific classification
- Domain: Eukaryota
- Kingdom: Animalia
- Phylum: Arthropoda
- Class: Insecta
- Order: Coleoptera
- Suborder: Polyphaga
- Infraorder: Staphyliniformia
- Family: Hydrophilidae
- Subfamily: Acidocerinae
- Genus: Batochares; Hansen, 1991

Diversity
- 3 species

= Batochares =

Genus of beetles

Batochares is an Afrotropical genus of water scavenger beetles in the family Hydrophilidae represented by three described species.

== Taxonomy ==
The genus Batochares was described for the first time as a subgenus of Helochares by d’Orchymont in 1939; since the author did not explicitly designate a type species, the name was validated by fixing a Type species by Hansen in 1991.

== Description ==
Small-sized beetles (3–4 mm), pale brown in coloration, usually with a mottled appearance. A diagnosis of the genus was presented by Girón and Short.

== Species ==
1. Batochares burgeoni (d'Orchymont, 1939)
2. Batochares byrrhus (d'Orchymont, 1939)
3. Batochares corrugatus (Balfour-Browne, 1958)
