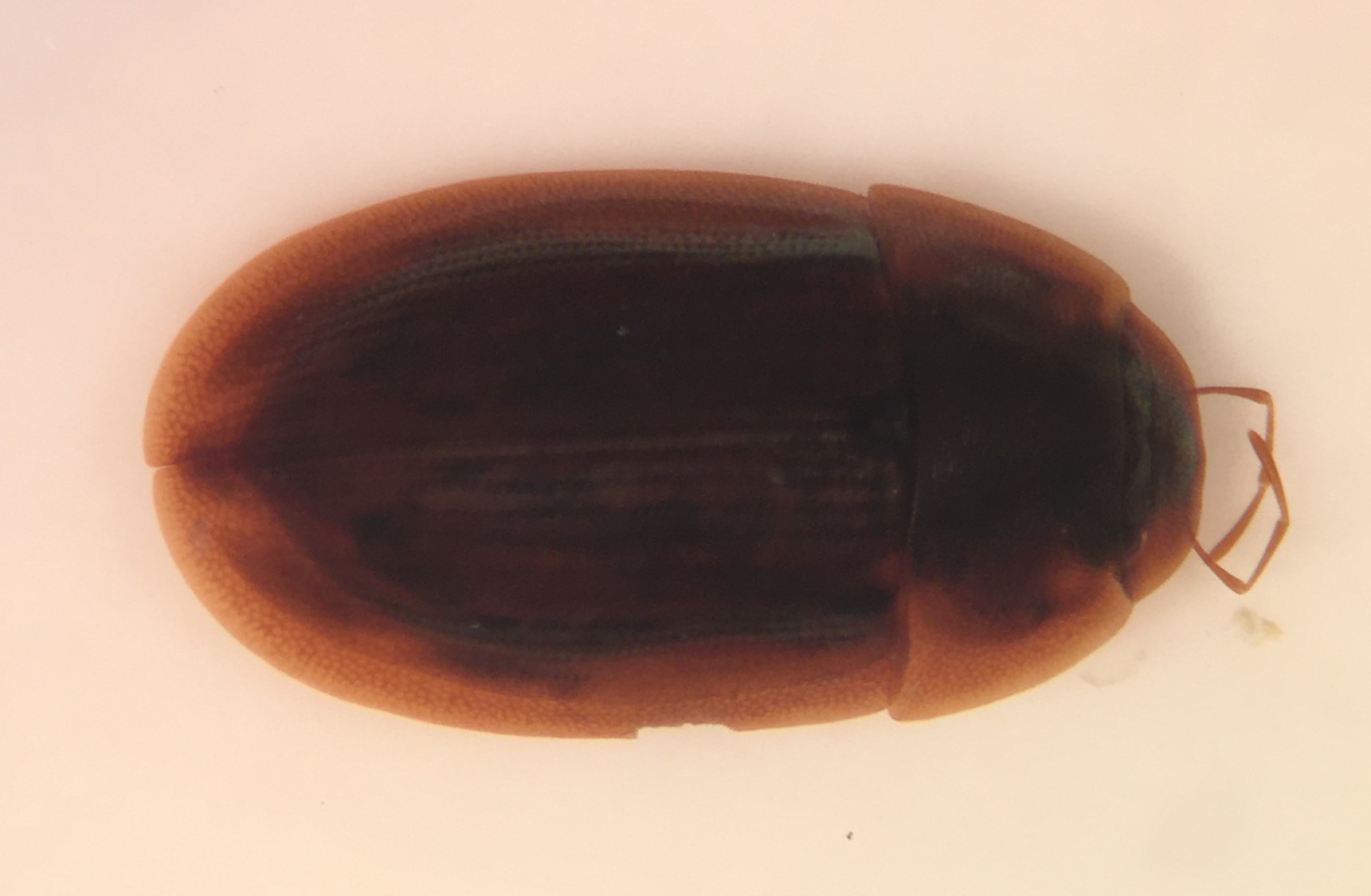

Scientific classification
- Domain: Eukaryota
- Kingdom: Animalia
- Phylum: Arthropoda
- Class: Insecta
- Order: Coleoptera
- Suborder: Polyphaga
- Infraorder: Staphyliniformia
- Family: Hydrophilidae
- Genus: Helobata
- Species: H. larvalis

Binomial name
- Helobata larvalis (Horn, 1873)

= Helobata larvalis =

Species of beetle

Helobata larvalis is a species of water scavenger beetle in the family Hydrophilidae. It is found in the Caribbean Sea, Central America, North America, and South America.
