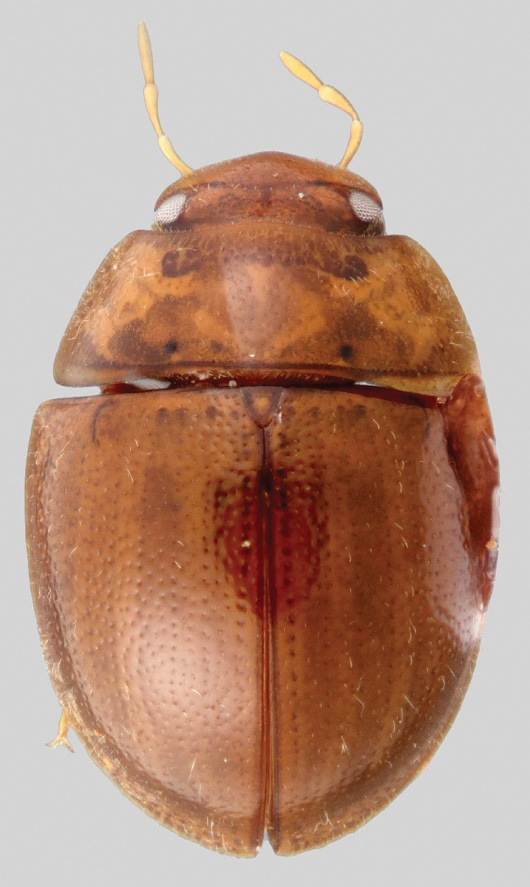
- Dorsal view of Globulosis flavus

Scientific classification
- Kingdom: Animalia
- Phylum: Arthropoda
- Class: Insecta
- Order: Coleoptera
- Suborder: Polyphaga
- Infraorder: Staphyliniformia
- Family: Hydrophilidae
- Subfamily: Acidocerinae
- Genus: Globulosis; García, 2001

Diversity
- 2 species

= Globulosis =

Genus of beetles

Globulosis is a Neotropical genus of water scavenger beetle in the family Hydrophilidae represented by two described species known from the Guiana Shield Region.

== Taxonomy ==
The genus Globulosis was described for the first time by Mauricio García in 2001.

It belongs in the subfamily Acidocerinae and contains two described species from Brazil (Amazonas, Pará), Colombia, Guyana, Suriname, and Venezuela.

== Description ==
Small beetles (1.9–2.3 mm), broadly oval in dorsal view and strongly convex in lateral view, yellow to orange-brown in coloration, with long maxillary palps. A complete diagnosis was presented by Girón and Short.

== Habitat ==
According to Girón and Short "The genus is most commonly found along the margins of small, sandy forested streams, especially with vegetated margins. However, a few specimens have been taken in shallow swamps."

== Species ==
1. Globulosis hemisphericus García, 2001
2. Globulosis flavus Short, García, and Girón, 2017
