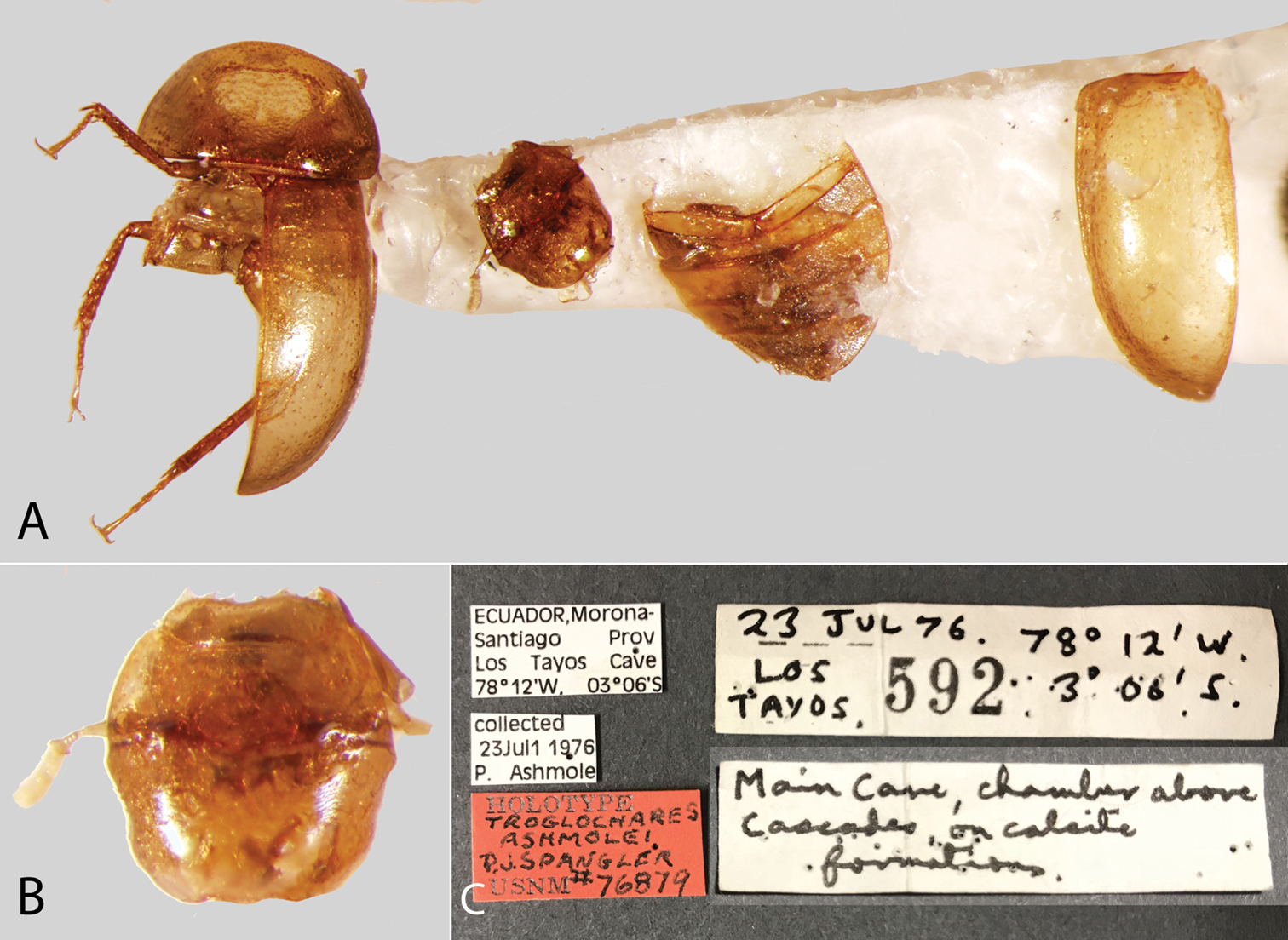
- Dorsal view of Troglochares ashmolei

Scientific classification
- Kingdom: Animalia
- Phylum: Arthropoda
- Class: Insecta
- Order: Coleoptera
- Suborder: Polyphaga
- Infraorder: Staphyliniformia
- Superfamily: Hydrophiloidea
- Family: Hydrophilidae
- Subfamily: Acidocerinae
- Genus: Troglochares; Spangler, 1981
- Species: T. ashmolei

Binomial name
- Troglochares ashmolei Spangler, 1981

= Troglochares =

Genus of beetles

Troglochares is a Neotropical genus of water scavenger beetle in the family Hydrophilidae represented by one described species known from caves in Ecuador.

== Taxonomy ==
The genus Troglochares belongs in the subfamily Acidocerinae. It was described for the first time by Paul Spangler in 1981 to accommodate an eyeless species from Los Tayos Cave in Morona-Santiago Province, Ecuador.

== Description ==
Small beetles (1.9 mm), smooth and shiny dorsally, yellowish-brown in coloration, with moderately long maxillary palps. The most salient characteristic of the genus is the lack of eyes. A complete diagnosis was presented by Girón and Short.

== Habitat ==
Troglochares ashmolei is the only acidocerine species known to occur in cavernicolous habitats.

== Species ==
- Troglochares ashmolei Spangler, 1981
