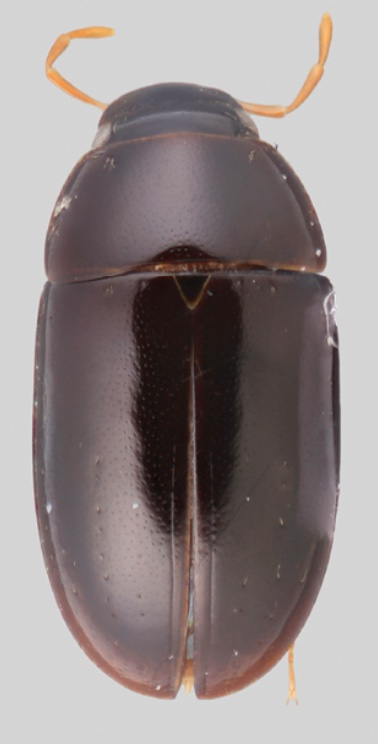
- Dorsal view of Chasmogenus lineatus

Scientific classification
- Kingdom: Animalia
- Phylum: Arthropoda
- Class: Insecta
- Order: Coleoptera
- Suborder: Polyphaga
- Infraorder: Staphyliniformia
- Family: Hydrophilidae
- Subfamily: Acidocerinae
- Genus: Chasmogenus; Sharp, 1882

Type species
- Chasmogenus fragilis Sharp, 1882

Diversity
- 36 species described to 2021

Synonyms
- Dieroxenus Spangler, 1979

= Chasmogenus =

Genus of beetles

Chasmogenus is a Neotropical genus of water scavenger beetles belonging to the family Hydrophilidae.

== Taxonomy ==
The genus Chasmogenus was described for the first time by David Sharp in 1882 for species from Guatemala and Panama.

Since 1919 the genus Crephelochares (from the Old World) was considered a synonym of Chasmogenus, but thanks to the results of a phylogenetic analysis involving molecular data, both taxa are now considered distinct genera on their own right.

Currently, a total of 36 species is identified and documented, most of them recorded from the Guiana Shield Region.

== Description ==
Small size (2.5–5.0 mm), bearing a clearly visible sutural stria; long maxillary palps; metafemora usually densely covered by hydrofuge pubescence. The external morphology in Chasmogenus is very uniform across species, so that most species can only be identified by the shape of the male genitalia.

By the presence of the sutural stria, in the Neotropical region, Chasmogenus can only be confused with some members of the genus Primocerus.

== Habitat ==
According to Girón and Short:

The vast majority of Chasmogenus are known from forested habitats, including the margins of streams and forest pools. A few species are known from open marsh habitats (e.g., Chasmogenus australis García and Chasmogenus sapucay Fernández). They can be found among the vegetation and submerged leaf litter. They are also attracted to lights, though usually not in large numbers. Only one species [Chasmogenus cremobates (Spangler)] has been collected in seepages.

— Girón and Short, The Acidocerinae (Coleoptera, Hydrophilidae): taxonomy, classification, and catalog of species

== Species ==
1. Chasmogenus acuminatus Smith and Short, 2020
2. Chasmogenus amplius Smith and Short, 2020
3. Chasmogenus australis García, 2000
4. Chasmogenus bariorum García, 2000
5. Chasmogenus barrae Short, 2005
6. Chasmogenus berbicensis Smith and Short, 2020
7. Chasmogenus brownsbergensis Smith and Short, 2020
8. Chasmogenus cajuina Alves, Clarkson and Lima, 2020
9. Chasmogenus castaneus Smith and Short, 2020
10. Chasmogenus clavijoi Smith and Short, 2020
11. Chasmogenus clinatus Glynn and Short, 2021
12. Chasmogenus cremnobates (Spangler, 1979)
13. Chasmogenus cuspifer Smith and Short, 2020
14. Chasmogenus flavomarginatus Smith and Short, 2020
15. Chasmogenus fluminensis Clarkson and Ferreira-Jr, 2014
16. Chasmogenus fragilis Sharp, 1882
17. Chasmogenus gato Smith and Short, 2020
18. Chasmogenus gironae Glynn and Short, 2021
19. Chasmogenus guianensis Smith and Short, 2020
20. Chasmogenus ignotus Smith and Short, 2020
21. Chasmogenus inpa Glynn and Short, 2021
22. Chasmogenus itatiaia Clarkson and Ferreira-Jr, 2014
23. Chasmogenus ligulatus Smith and Short, 2020
24. Chasmogenus lilianae Clarkson and Ferreira-Jr, 2014
25. Chasmogenus lineatus Smith and Short, 2020
26. Chasmogenus lorenzo Short, 2005
27. Chasmogenus pandus Smith and Short, 2020
28. Chasmogenus rufinasus (Knisch, 1924)
29. Chasmogenus ruidus Short, 2005
30. Chasmogenus sapucay Fernández, 1986
31. Chasmogenus schmits Smith and Short, 2020
32. Chasmogenus schoedli Short, 2005
33. Chasmogenus sinnamarensis Smith and Short, 2020
34. Chasmogenus tafelbergensis Smith and Short, 2020
35. Chasmogenus ubatuba Clarkson and Ferreira-Jr, 2014
36. Chasmogenus undulatus Smith and Short, 2020
