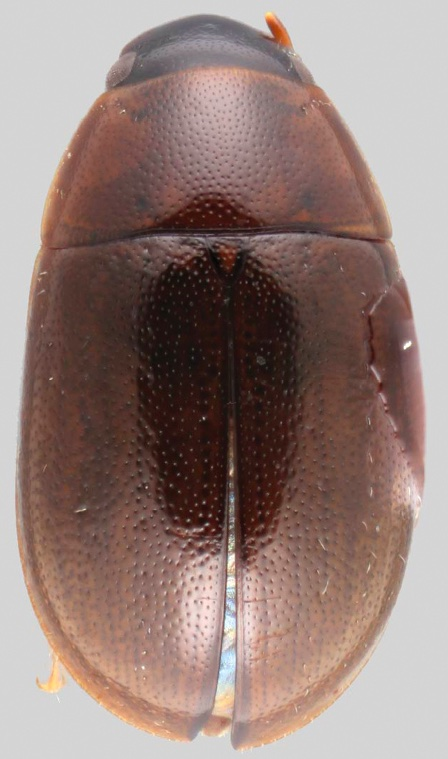
- Dorsal view of Ephydrolithus hamadae

Scientific classification
- Kingdom: Animalia
- Phylum: Arthropoda
- Class: Insecta
- Order: Coleoptera
- Suborder: Polyphaga
- Infraorder: Staphyliniformia
- Family: Hydrophilidae
- Subfamily: Acidocerinae
- Genus: Ephydrolithus; Girón & Short, 2018

Diversity
- 5 species

= Ephydrolithus =

Genus of beetles

Ephydrolithus is a Neotropical genus of water scavenger beetle in the family Hydrophilidae represented by five described species known from Brazil.

== Taxonomy ==
The genus Ephydrolithus was described for the first time by Girón & Short in 2019.

It belongs in the subfamily Acidocerinae and contains three described species from Brazil (Bahía, Minas Gerais).

== Description ==
Small beetles (1.8–3.3 mm), yellowish-brown to dark brown in coloration, with relatively short maxillary palps. A complete diagnosis was presented by Girón and Short.

== Habitat ==
According to Girón and Short "All known species are exclusively associated with rock seepages".

== Species ==
1. Ephydrolithus hamadae Girón and Short, 2019
2. Ephydrolithus minor Girón and Short, 2019
3. Ephydrolithus ogmos Girón and Short, 2019
4. Ephydrolithus spiculatus Girón and Short, 2019
5. Ephydrolithus teli Girón and Short, 2019
