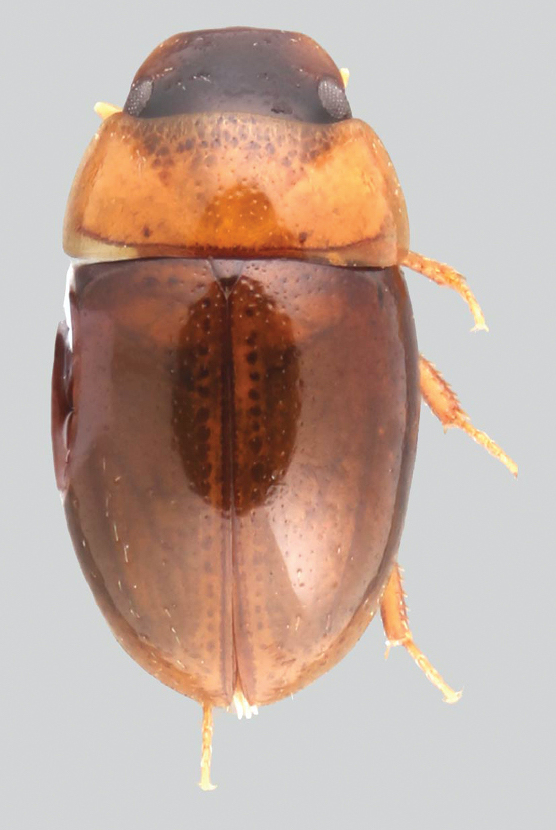
- Dorsal view of Nanosaphes tricolor

Scientific classification
- Kingdom: Animalia
- Phylum: Arthropoda
- Class: Insecta
- Order: Coleoptera
- Suborder: Polyphaga
- Infraorder: Staphyliniformia
- Family: Hydrophilidae
- Subfamily: Acidocerinae
- Genus: Nanosaphes; Girón & Short, 2018

Diversity
- 4 species

= Nanosaphes =

Genus of beetles

Nanosaphes is a Neotropical genus of water scavenger beetles in the family Hydrophilidae represented by seven described species known from the Guiana Shield Region.

== Taxonomy ==
The genus Nanosaphes was described for the first time by Girón & Short in 2018.

It belongs in the subfamily Acidocerinae and contains seven described species from Brazil (Pará), Guyana, and Suriname.

== Description ==
Tiny beetles (1.15–1.45 mm), smooth and shiny dorsally, yellowish-brown to dark brown in coloration, with long maxillary palps. The most salient characteristic of the genus is the minute size of its members. A complete diagnosis was presented by Girón and Short.

== Habitat ==
According to Girón and Short "species are associated with stream margins, particularly where there are marginal banks of sand and roots.".

== Species ==
1. Nanosaphes castaneus Girón and Short, 2018
2. Nanosaphes hesperus Girón and Short, 2018
3. Nanosaphes punctatus Girón and Short, 2018
4. Nanosaphes tricolor Girón and Short, 2018
