= Helochares normatus =

Scientific classification
- Domain: Eukaryota
- Kingdom: Animalia
- Phylum: Arthropoda
- Class: Insecta
- Order: Coleoptera
- Suborder: Polyphaga
- Infraorder: Staphyliniformia
- Family: Hydrophilidae
- Genus: Helochares
- Species: H. normatus

Binomial name
- Helochares normatus (LeConte, 1861)

Synonyms
- Helochares regularis Sharp, 1882; Helochares seriatus Sharp, 1882

Species of beetle

Helochares normatus is a species of water scavenger beetle in the family Hydrophilidae. It is found in Central America and North America.
