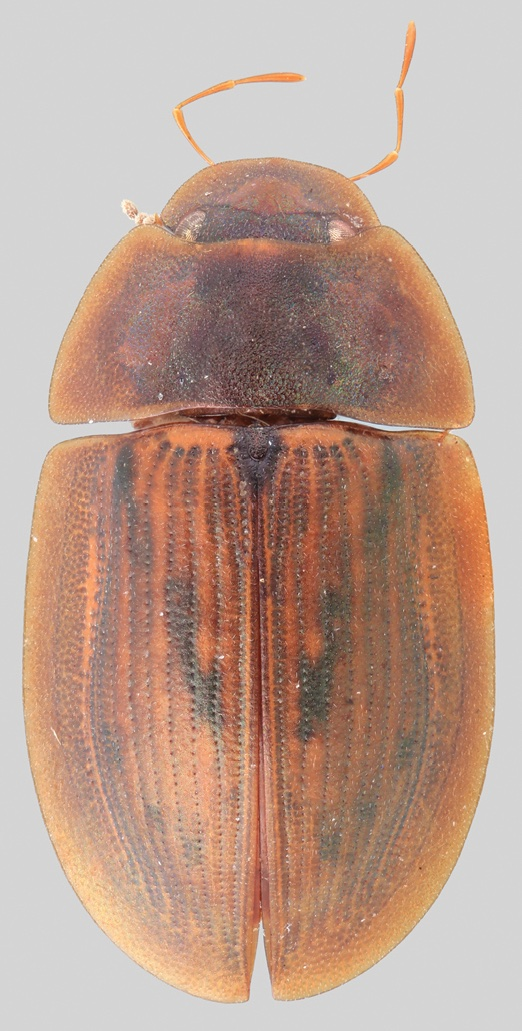
- Dorsal view of Helobata larvalis

Scientific classification
- Domain: Eukaryota
- Kingdom: Animalia
- Phylum: Arthropoda
- Class: Insecta
- Order: Coleoptera
- Suborder: Polyphaga
- Infraorder: Staphyliniformia
- Family: Hydrophilidae
- Subfamily: Acidocerinae
- Genus: Helobata; Bergroth, 1888

Diversity
- 13 species

= Helobata =

Genus of beetles

Helobata is a mostly Neotropical genus of water scavenger beetles in the family Hydrophilidae. It contains 13 described species, one of which is broadly distributed, reaching North America.

== Taxonomy ==
The genus Helobata was described for the first time by Ernst Evald Bergroth in 1888.

It belongs in the subfamily Acidocerinae and contains 13 described species.

== Description ==
Medium-sized beetles (4–7 mm), yellowish-brown to dark brown in coloration, with granulose surface, usually with a mottled or patterned appearance. The pronotum and elytra are flattened and broadly explanate. The maxillary palps are long. A complete diagnosis was presented by Girón and Short.

== Habitat ==
According to Girón and Short "Species of Helobata occur primarily in open habitats with abundant vegetation".

== Species ==
The genus includes the following species:

1. Helobata amazonensis Clarkson, Santos & Ferreira-Jr, 2016: Brazil (Amazonas, Roraima)
2. Helobata aschnakiranae Makhan, 2007: Suriname
3. Helobata bitriangulata García, 2000: Venezuela
4. Helobata confusa Fernández & Bachmann, 1987: Argentina, Paraguay
5. Helobata corumbaensis Fernández & Bachmann, 1987: Brazil (Mato Grosso, Mato Grosso do Sul)
6. Helobata cossyphoides (Bruch, 1915): Argentina
7. Helobata cuivaum García, 2000: Venezuela
8. Helobata larvalis (Horn, 1873): Argentina, Bolivia, Brazil (Amazonas, Ceará, Mato Grosso, Mato Grosso do Sul, Minas Gerais), Cuba, Guatemala, Mexico, Paraguay, Venezuela. U.S.A. (California, Florida, Louisiana, Mississippi, North Carolina, South Carolina, Texas, Virginia).
9. Helobata lilianae García, 2000: Venezuela
10. Helobata pantaneira Clarkson, Santos & Ferreira-Jr, 2016: Brazil (Mato Grosso)
11. Helobata perpunctata Fernández & Bachmann, 1987: Argentina
12. Helobata quatipuru Fernández & Bachmann, 1987: Brazil (Minas Gerais, Pará, Rio de Janeiro)
13. Helobata soesilae Makhan, 2007: Suriname
