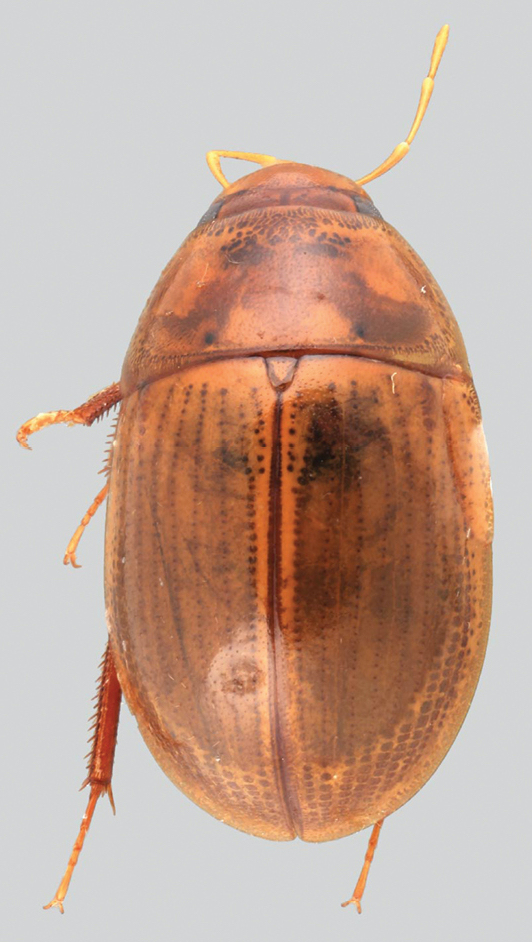
- Dorsal view of Sindolus optatus

Scientific classification
- Kingdom: Animalia
- Phylum: Arthropoda
- Class: Insecta
- Order: Coleoptera
- Suborder: Polyphaga
- Infraorder: Staphyliniformia
- Family: Hydrophilidae
- Subfamily: Acidocerinae
- Genus: Sindolus; Sharp, 1882

Diversity
- 8 species

= Sindolus =

Genus of beetles

Sindolus is a Neotropical genus of water scavenger beetles in the family Hydrophilidae represented by eight described species, ranging from Mexico to Argentina, and including one species recorded from Antigua in the Lesser Antilles.

== Taxonomy ==
The genus Sindolus belongs in the subfamily Acidocerinae. It was first described by David Sharp in 1882 to accommodate two Central American species. Since 1919 Sindolus was considered a subgenus of the genus Helochares by d’Orchymont and stayed in that category until a molecular-based phylogenetic analysis supported its restitution at the category of genus.

== Description ==
Small to sized beetles (2.5–5.0 mm), smooth and shiny dorsally, moderately to strongly convex in lateral view; yellowish, orange-brown, to brown in coloration, with long maxillary palps. The most distinctive characteristic of Sindolus is the presence of a sharp and strongly elevated (laminar) longitudinal carina on the mesoventrite. A complete diagnosis was presented by Girón and Short.

== Habitat ==
Some species of Sindolus have been collected in stagnant waters at low elevations in dry areas.

== Species ==
1. Sindolus femoratus (Brullé, 1841): Argentina, Brazil (Bahia, Pernambuco, Piauí, Rio de Janeiro, Rio Grande do Sul), Colombia [in doubt], French Guiana [in doubt], Antigua.
2. Sindolus mesostitialis (Fernández, 1981): Argentina, Brazil (Mato Grosso do Sul)
3. Sindolus mini (Fernández, 1982): Argentina, Paraguay
4. Sindolus mundus Sharp, 1882: Costa Rica, Mexico, Nicaragua
5. Sindolus optatus Sharp, 1882: Costa Rica, Guatemala, Mexico
6. Sindolus spatulatus (Fernández, 1981): Argentina, Paraguay
7. Sindolus talarum (Fernández, 1983): Argentina
8. Sindolus ventricosus (Bruch, 1915): Argentina, Bolivia, Brazil (Amazonas, Mato Grosso do Sul, Pernambuco), Paraguay, Uruguay.
