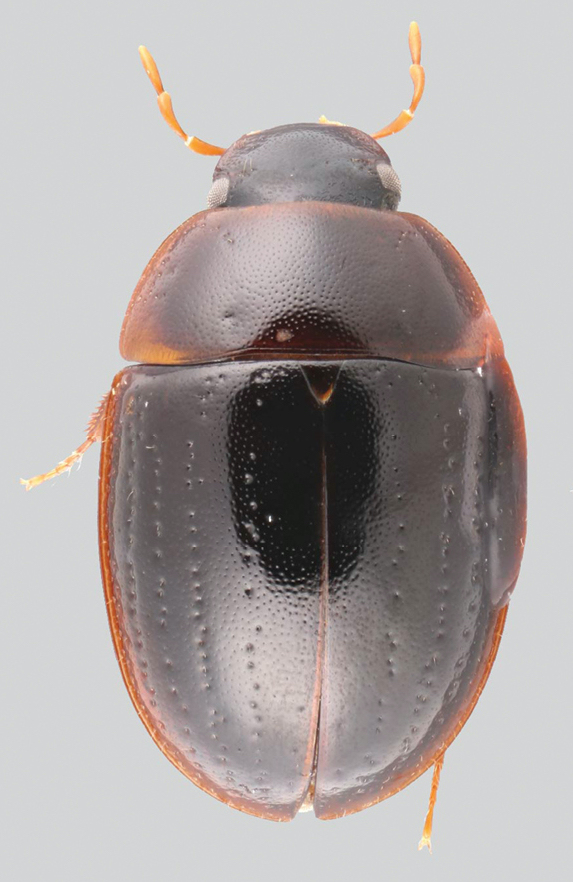
- Dorsal view of Katasophistes merida

Scientific classification
- Kingdom: Animalia
- Phylum: Arthropoda
- Class: Insecta
- Order: Coleoptera
- Suborder: Polyphaga
- Infraorder: Staphyliniformia
- Family: Hydrophilidae
- Subfamily: Acidocerinae
- Genus: Katasophistes; Girón & Short, 2018

Diversity
- 4 species

= Katasophistes =

Genus of beetles

Katasophistes is a Neotropical genus of water scavenger beetle in the family Hydrophilidae represented by four described species known from the Guiana Shield Region.

== Taxonomy ==
The genus Katasophistes was described for the first time by Girón & Short in 2018.

It belongs in the subfamily Acidocerinae and contains four described species from Ecuador, Peru, and Venezuela.

== Description ==
Small beetles (2.7–4.5 mm), smooth and shiny dorsally, brown to dark brown in coloration, with long maxillary palps. A complete diagnosis was presented by Girón and Short.

== Habitat ==
According to Girón and Short species known from Ecuador and Peru have been collected from forested stream pools with abundant detritus, whereas Katasophistes merida from Venezuela has been collected on seepages.

== Species ==
These four species belong to the genus Katasophistes:

1. Katasophistes charynae Girón & Short, 2018 (Peru)
2. Katasophistes cuzco Girón & Short, 2018 (Peru)
3. Katasophistes merida Girón & Short, 2018 (Venezuela)
4. Katasophistes superficialis Girón & Short, 2018 (Ecuador)
