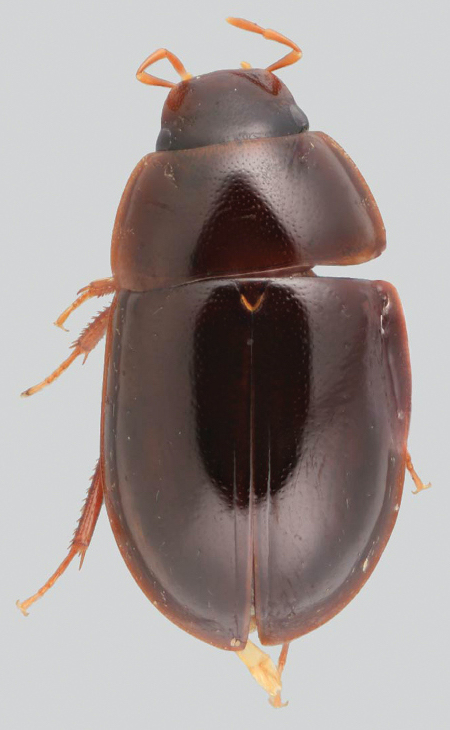
- Dorsal view of Primocerus neutrum

Scientific classification
- Kingdom: Animalia
- Phylum: Arthropoda
- Class: Insecta
- Order: Coleoptera
- Suborder: Polyphaga
- Infraorder: Staphyliniformia
- Family: Hydrophilidae
- Subfamily: Acidocerinae
- Genus: Primocerus; Girón & Short, 2019

Diversity
- 9 species

= Primocerus =

Genus of beetles

Primocerus is a Neotropical genus of water scavenger beetle in the family Hydrophilidae represented by nine described species known from the Guiana Shield Region.

== Taxonomy ==
The genus Primocerus was described for the first time by Girón & Short in 2019.

It belongs in the subfamily Acidocerinae and contains nine described species from Brazil (Pará), Guyana, Suriname, and Venezuela.

== Description ==
Small to medium-sized beetles (2.4–4.9 mm), smooth and shiny dorsally, orange-brown, reddish brown, or dark brown in coloration, with moderately long maxillary palps. The elytral punctation ranges from shallow to strongly marked, forming impressed serial striae; all the species bear a well defined sutural stria. A complete diagnosis was presented by Girón and Short.

== Habitat ==
According to Girón and Short, "The habitats occupied by members of Primocerus range from forested pools to seepages".

== Species ==
1. Primocerus cuspidis Girón and Short, 2019
2. Primocerus gigas Girón and Short, 2019
3. Primocerus maipure Girón and Short, 2019
4. Primocerus neutrum Girón and Short, 2019
5. Primocerus ocellatus Girón and Short, 2019
6. Primocerus petilus Girón and Short, 2019
7. Primocerus pijiguaense Girón and Short, 2019
8. Primocerus semipubescens Girón and Short, 2019
9. Primocerus striatolatus Girón and Short, 2019
