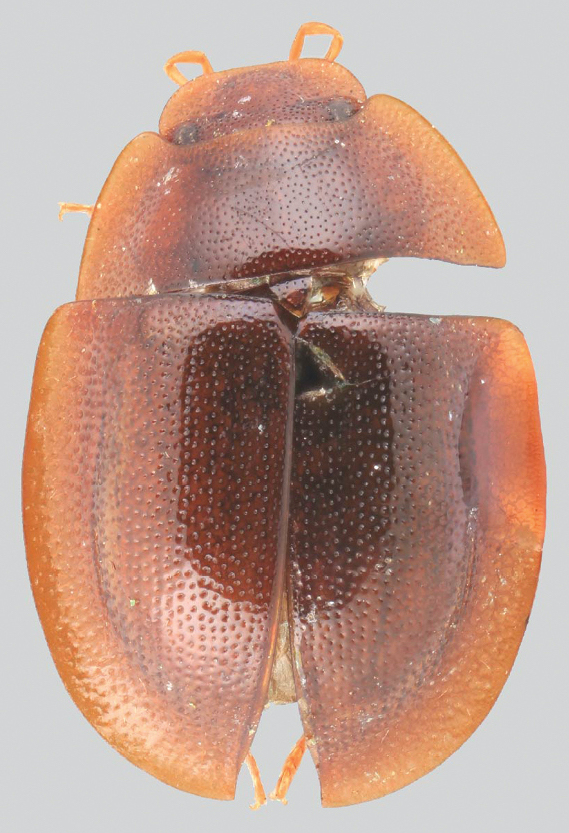
- Dorsal view of H. ferrugineum

Scientific classification
- Domain: Eukaryota
- Kingdom: Animalia
- Phylum: Arthropoda
- Class: Insecta
- Order: Coleoptera
- Suborder: Polyphaga
- Infraorder: Staphyliniformia
- Family: Hydrophilidae
- Genus: Helopeltarium d’Orchymont, 1943
- Species: H. ferrugineum

Binomial name
- Helopeltarium ferrugineum d’Orchymont, 1943

= Helopeltarium =

Genus of beetles

Helopeltarium is a genus of water scavenger beetle in the family Hydrophilidae represented by only one species. It is known only from Myanmar.

== Taxonomy ==
The genus Helopeltarium was described for the first time by Armand d'Orchymont in 1943. The genus is represented by only one species known from two specimens.

== Description ==
Small beetles (2.8 mm), strongly dorsoventrally flattened, orange-brown in coloration; pronotum and elytra laterally explanate. A more complete diagnosis was presented by Jennifer C. Girón and Andrew Edward Z. Short.

== Species ==
- Helopeltarium ferrugineum d’Orchymont, 1943
