= Philipp Zaitzev =

Russian entomologist (1877–1957)

- Russian: Филипп Адамович Зайцев
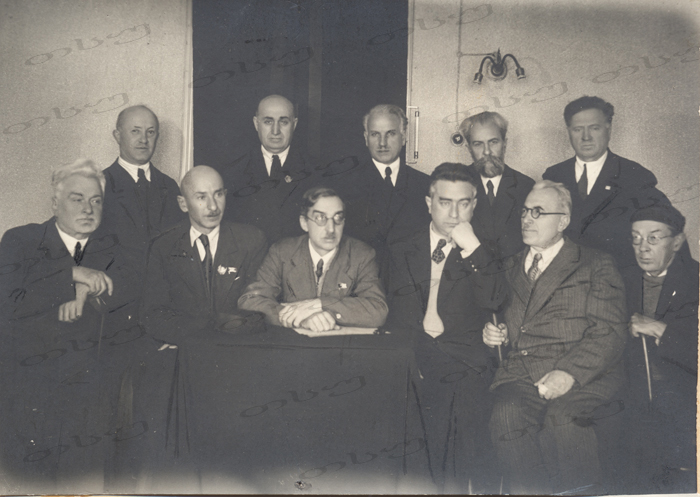
- Members of the Georgian Academy of Sciences, Zaitzev seated at extreme right, 1941
- Born: 26 March 1877; Kiev, Russian Empire
- Died: 20 June 1957 (aged 80)
- Education: St Petersburg University

Philipp Adamovich Zaitzev sometimes initialized as F. A. Zaitzev (Russian: Филипп Адамович Зайцев; 26 March 1877 – 20 June 1957) was a Russian entomologist who specialized in the beetles, particularly the aquatic beetle families. He worked on the fauna of the Caucasus and from 1905 he worked at the Institute of Agriculture and Forestry in Novaya Alexandria of Lyublinskaya Province and later at the Tbilisi State University.

== Life and work ==
Philipp Zaitzev was born in Kiev, where his father was a postal officer. He studied at the Kiev classical gymnasium where he took an interest in the languages and excelled in Latin and Greek. He later studied several European languages. He graduated in 1895 with a gold medal and joined St Petersburg University in the Faculty of Oriental Languages. Here he began to attend lectures in the natural sciences and was influenced by anatomy professor P.F. Lesgaft, histologist A.S. Dogiel, and the professors V.M. Shimkevich, and V.T. Shivyakov. He also interacted with the musicians, composers and writers of the period. Under Dogiel, he began to study the "capsula glomeruli" or Bowman's capsules in mammals. He also began to assist teaching histology. When he participated in a strike by the students, he was expelled in February 1899 but received permission again after difficulty and graduated in 1900.

Zaitzev then taught histology at the St Petersburg Women's Medical Institute. In 1901, he went to the Bologovskaya Freshwater Biological Station and studied rotifers. He began to study the insects of Novgorod Province. After describing many new species, he was elected to the Russian Entomological Society on 4 October 1904. He met Nikolai Alexadndrovich Kholodkovsky and his student Eugeny Nikanorovich Pavlovsky and became involved in the establishment of a zoology department at Tbilisi. In 1905 he became an assistant at the Institute of Agriculture and Forestry in Novaya Alexandria of Lyublinskaya Province. During this period, he travelled around museums and began to work on the aquatic beetles in the families Dryopidae, Heteroceridae, and Hydrophilidae, and published a catalogue in the "Coleopterorum catalogue". From 1911, he was assigned to examine applied entomology in Transcaucasia and he began to organize an insect collection in the Tiflis Botanical Garden.
