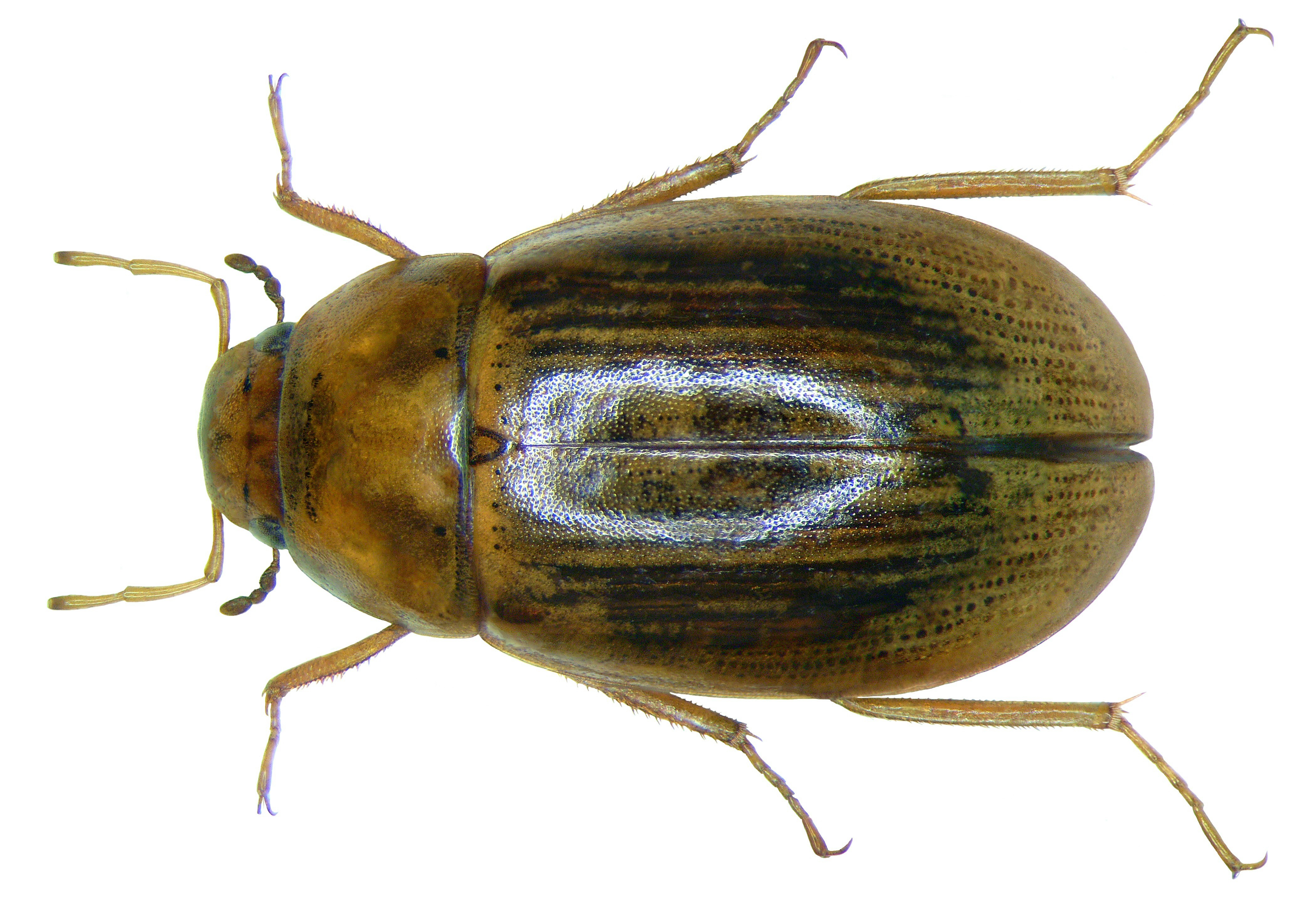
- Helochares lividus

Scientific classification
- Kingdom: Animalia
- Phylum: Arthropoda
- Clade: Pancrustacea
- Class: Insecta
- Order: Coleoptera
- Suborder: Polyphaga
- Infraorder: Staphyliniformia
- Family: Hydrophilidae
- Subfamily: Hydrophilinae
- Tribe: Hydrophilini
- Genus: Helochares; Mulsant, 1844

Diversity
- 158 species + 3 subspecies

Synonyms
- Helophilus Mulsant, 1844; Pylophilus Motschulsky, 1845; Hydrobaticus MacLeay, 1871; Helocharimorphus Kuwert, 1890; Graphelochares Kuwert, 1890; Grapidelochares Ganglbauer, 1904

= Helochares =

Genus of beetles

Helochares is a genus of water scavenger beetles in the family Hydrophilidae, represented by 161 described species. It is distributed across the Afrotropical, Australasian, Indo-Malayan, Nearctic, and Palearctic realms.

== Description ==
As currently defined, Helochares contains small to medium-sized beetles (2–7 mm), which are yellowish to brown in coloration. There is a lot of variation in the impression of the elytral punctation, and the aedeagal forms are also highly variable (see Figure 37 in Girón and Short 2021). A detailed diagnosis can be found in Girón and Short 2021. Females carry their eggs in a cocoon anchored to the hind femora and held under the abdomen as in several other Hydrophilidae.

== Taxonomy ==
Helochares is one of the largest and most taxonomically problematic genera within the Acidocerinae. It was originally described by Étienne Mulsant in 1844.

For a long time Helochares contained five subgenera: Batochares (currently recognized as a separate genus), Helochares, Helocharimorphus (now synonymized under Helochares), Hydrobaticus (now synonymized under Helochares), and Sindolus (currently recognized as a separate genus).

Several taxa that used to be recognized as typical Helochares are now assigned to newly created genera (e.g., Colossochares, Novochares) or re-assigned to exinsting genera (i.e., Peltochares), based on a phylogenetic analysis based on molecular data.

== Species ==
1. Helochares aeacus Balfour-Browne, 1952
2. Helochares aethiopicus d'Orchymont, 1939
3. Helochares alberti d'Orchymont, 1943
4. Helochares alcimus d'Orchymont, 1943
5. Helochares alcinous Balfour-Browne, 1948
6. Helochares altus d'Orchymont, 1943
7. Helochares anchoralis Sharp, 1890
8. Helochares ancoroides Hebauer, 2001
9. Helochares anchoralis expansus Knisch, 1921
10. Helochares andreinii d'Orchymont, 1939
11. Helochares androgynus Hebauer, 1996
12. Helochares anthonyae Watts, 1995
13. Helochares balfourbrownei Hansen, 1999
14. Helochares basilewskyi Balfour-Browne, 1957
15. Helochares bilardoi Hebauer, 2009
16. Helochares blaesus d'Orchymont, 1936
17. Helochares bohemani d'Orchymont, 1936
18. Helochares camerunensis d'Orchymont, 1939
19. Helochares cancellatus Hebauer, 1998
20. Helochares championi Sharp, 1882
21. Helochares chappuisi Balfour-Browne, 1952
22. Helochares clypeatus (Blackburn, 1891)
23. Helochares collarti d'Orchymont, 1939
24. Helochares compactus Hebauer, 2001
25. Helochares conformis Hebauer, 1995
26. Helochares congoensis d'Orchymont, 1939
27. Helochares congruens d'Orchymont, 1939
28. Helochares conjectus d'Orchymont, 1939
29. Helochares crenatostriatus Régimbart, 1903
30. Helochares crenatuloides d'Orchymont, 1943
31. Helochares crenatus Régimbart, 1903
32. Helochares crepitus Balfour-Browne, 1950
33. Helochares cresphontes d'Orchymont, 1939
34. Helochares crespulus d'Orchymont, 1939
35. Helochares crispus d'Orchymont, 1939
36. Helochares dalhuntyi Watts, 1995
37. Helochares densepunctus Régimbart, 1907
38. Helochares densus Sharp, 1890
39. Helochares dentalus d'Orchymont, 1943
40. Helochares denudatus d'Orchymont, 1943
41. Helochares depactus d'Orchymont, 1939
42. Helochares diductus d'Orchymont, 1939
43. Helochares didymoides Balfour-Browne, 1947
44. Helochares didymus d'Orchymont, 1939
45. Helochares difficilis d'Orchymont, 1939
46. Helochares dilutus (Erichson, 1843)
47. Helochares dilutus consputus Boheman, 1851
48. Helochares dimorphus d'Orchymont, 1939
49. Helochares distinctus Jia & Tang, 2021
50. Helochares dollmani Balfour-Browne, 1950
51. Helochares dolus d'Orchymont, 1939
52. Helochares egregius Balfour-Browne, 1952
53. Helochares endroedyi Hebauer, 1996
54. Helochares fratris Hebauer, 2003
55. Helochares fulgurans Hebauer, 1995
56. Helochares fuliginosus d'Orchymont, 1932
57. Helochares goticus Hebauer, 1996
58. Helochares guoi Yang & Jia, 2021
59. Helochares hainanensis Dong and Bian, 2021
60. Helochares hiekei Hebauer, 1995
61. Helochares insolitus d'Orchymont, 1925
62. Helochares interjectus Hebauer, 1998
63. Helochares iteratus Hebauer, 1996
64. Helochares itylus Balfour-Browne, 1952
65. Helochares ivani Hebauer, 1996
66. Helochares kerstinneumanni Hebauer, 2009
67. Helochares knischi d'Orchymont, 1939
68. Helochares laevis Short and Girón, 2018
69. Helochares lamprus d'Orchymont, 1940
70. Helochares lentus Sharp, 1890
71. Helochares lepidus d'Orchymont, 1943
72. Helochares leptinus d'Orchymont, 1943
73. Helochares letus d'Orchymont, 1943
74. Helochares livianus d'Orchymont, 1939
75. Helochares lividoides Hansen and Hebauer, 1988
76. Helochares lividus (Forster, 1771)
77. Helochares lobatus d'Orchymont, 1948
78. Helochares lollius d'Orchymont, 1939
79. Helochares loticus Hebauer, 1998
80. Helochares loweryae Watts, 1995
81. Helochares luridus (MacLeay, 1871)
82. Helochares lutulentus Balfour-Browne, 1952
83. Helochares maculatus Hebauer, 1988
84. Helochares maculicollis Mulsant, 1844
85. Helochares madli Hebauer, 2002
86. Helochares marreensis Watts, 1995
87. Helochares mecarus d'Orchymont, 1939
88. Helochares mediastinus d'Orchymont, 1939
89. Helochares melanophthalmus (Mulsant, 1844)
90. Helochares mendosus Hebauer, 1996
91. Helochares mentinotus Kuwert, 1888
92. Helochares menulus d'Orchymont, 1943
93. Helochares meracus Balfour-Browne, 1950
94. Helochares mersus d'Orchymont, 1939
95. Helochares minax d'Orchymont, 1939
96. Helochares minor d'Orchymont, 1925
97. Helochares minusculus d'Orchymont, 1943
98. Helochares namcatensis Hebauer, 2002
99. Helochares nebridius d'Orchymont, 1940
100. Helochares negatus Hebauer, 1995
101. Helochares neglectus (Hope, 1845)
102. Helochares nexus Short and Girón, 2018
103. Helochares nigrifrons Brancsik, 1893
104. Helochares nigripalpis Hebauer and Hendrich, 1999
105. Helochares nigritulus Kuwert, 1889
106. Helochares nigroseriatus Hebauer, 1998
107. Helochares niobelus d'Orchymont, 1939
108. Helochares nipponicus Hebauer, 1995
109. Helochares normatus (LeConte, 1861)
110. Helochares notaticollis Régimbart, 1906
111. Helochares notaticollis curtus Régimbart, 1906
112. Helochares obliquus Mart, İncekara and Karaca, 2010
113. Helochares obscurus (Müller, 1776)
114. Helochares opacus Hebauer, 2009
115. Helochares pallens (MacLeay, 1825)
116. Helochares parallelus Hebauer, 1999
117. Helochares percyi Watts, 1995
118. Helochares perminutus Hebauer, 1996
119. Helochares phallicus d'Orchymont, 1936
120. Helochares politus Short and Girón, 2018
121. Helochares punctatus Sharp, 1869
122. Helochares rugipennis Balfour-Browne, 1958
123. Helochares salvazai d'Orchymont, 1919
124. Helochares sauteri d'Orchymont, 1943
125. Helochares schoedli Hebauer, 1996
126. Helochares schwendingeri Hebauer, 1995
127. Helochares scitulus Balfour-Browne, 1952
128. Helochares sechellensis Régimbart, 1903
129. Helochares serpentinus Hebauer, 1998
130. Helochares sharpi (Kuwert, 1890)
131. Helochares silvester Hebauer, 2009
132. Helochares simulator Knisch, 1922
133. Helochares skalei Hebauer, 2002
134. Helochares songi Jia and Tang, 2018
135. Helochares steffani Hebauer, 2002
136. Helochares stenius d'Orchymont, 1943
137. Helochares striatus (Boheman, 1851)
138. Helochares strictus d'Orchymont, 1939
139. Helochares strigellus Hebauer, 2002
140. Helochares structus d'Orchymont, 1936
141. Helochares sublineatus Hebauer, 2002
142. Helochares subseriatus Hebauer, 2009
143. Helochares subtilis d'Orchymont, 1936
144. Helochares sufflavus Balfour-Browne, 1952
145. Helochares sylvaticus Balfour-Browne, 1957
146. Helochares tamsi Balfour-Browne, 1947
147. Helochares tatei (Blackburn, 1896)
148. Helochares tengchongensis Dong and Bian, 2021
149. Helochares tenuistriatus Régimbart, 1908
150. Helochares tertius Hebauer, 1996
151. Helochares thurmerae Watts, 1995
152. Helochares tristis (MacLeay, 1871)
153. Helochares trujillo Short and Girón, 2018
154. Helochares uenoi Matsui, 1995
155. Helochares uhligi Hebauer, 1999
156. Helochares vitalisi d'Orchymont, 1919
157. Helochares wagneri Hebauer, 2002
158. Helochares wattsi Hebauer and Hendrich, 1999
159. Helochares wuzhifengensis Dong and Bian, 2021
160. Helochares yangae Hebauer, Hendrich, and Balke, 1999
161. Helochares zamora Short and Girón, 2018
