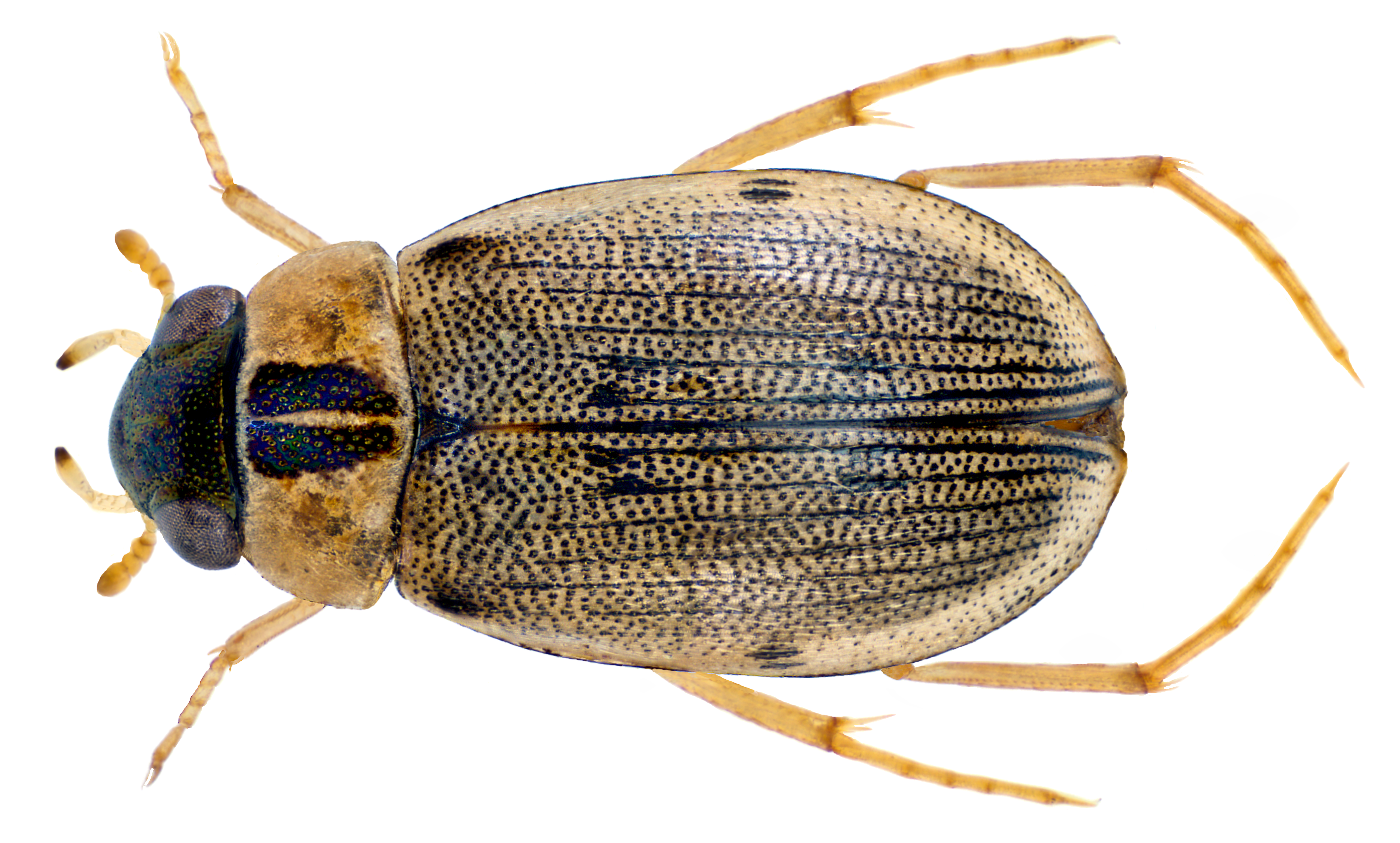

Scientific classification
- Kingdom: Animalia
- Phylum: Arthropoda
- Class: Insecta
- Order: Coleoptera
- Suborder: Polyphaga
- Infraorder: Staphyliniformia
- Family: Hydrophilidae
- Subfamily: Hydrophilinae
- Tribe: Berosini
- Genus: Berosus
- Species: B. pulchellus

Binomial name
- Berosus pulchellus W.S. MacLeay, 1825

Synonyms
- Berosus decrescens Walker, 1859; Berosus pubescens Mulsant & Rey, 1858; Berosus pulchellus W.S.MacLeay, 1825; Berosus vestitus Sharp, 1884

= Berosus pulchellus =

Species of beetle

Berosus pulchellus, is a species of water scavenger beetle that is found in Oriental, Australasian, Afrotropical and Palaearctic regional countries such as India, Sri Lanka, Hong Kong, Japan, Iran, Cambodia and Australia.

== Description ==
This slender, medium-sized aquatic beetle has an ovate body, with an average length of about 3.7 mm. The outline of the body is not interrupted between pronotum and elytra. The head is fully metallic while the pronotum is partially metallic. The pronotum consists of double punctures whereas the posterior angle is obtuse and well-defined. The elytra possess 10 rows of punctured striae. Middle and hind tibia are long with swimming hair. Male beetles have 4-segmented fore tarsi. There is no posteriorly elevated mesosternal carina and lateral margins of the metasternal process are evenly confluent.
