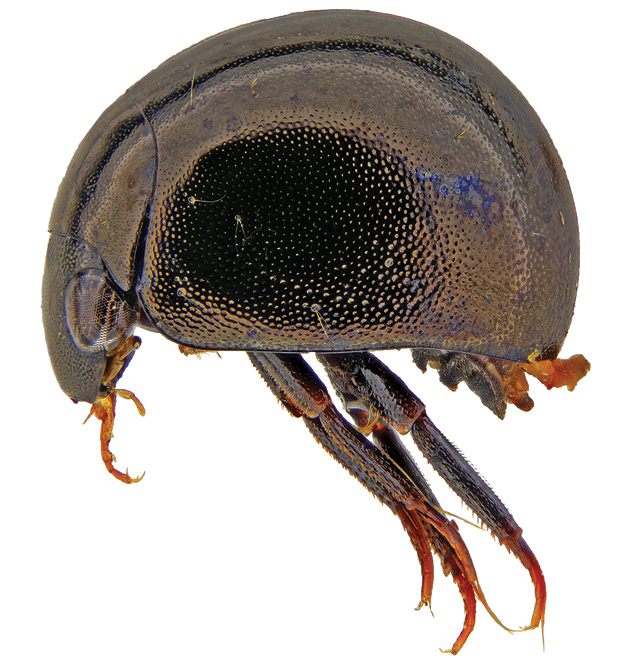

Scientific classification
- Kingdom: Animalia
- Phylum: Arthropoda
- Clade: Pancrustacea
- Class: Insecta
- Order: Coleoptera
- Suborder: Polyphaga
- Infraorder: Staphyliniformia
- Family: Hydrophilidae
- Tribe: Berosini
- Genus: Allocotocerus; Kraatz, 1883

Type species
- Allocotocerus bedeli

Synonyms
- Globaria Latreille, 1829; Aschnaia Makhan, 2007

= Allocotocerus =

Genus of water beetles

Allocotocerus is a genus of water beetles in the family Hydrophilidae, first described by Ernst Gustav Kraatz in 1883. The decision for synonymy is based on Hansen (1999).

The Australian beetles of this genus are found in Western Australia, the Northern Territory and Queensland.

Watts separates the three genera of Hydrophilidae (Amphiops, Allocotocerus, and Regimbartia) which occur in Australia, by describing species from the genus Allocotocerus as being black, of length 3.5—4.5 mm, having meso- and meta-tibiae with swimming hairs, normal eyes, and elytra as long as high and having almost no striae.

== Species ==
(as listed by GBIF)

- Allocotocerus bedeli Kraatz, 1883
- Allocotocerus indicus (Jayaswal, 1972)
- Allocotocerus kapuri (Jayaswal, 1972)
- Allocotocerus leachii (Hope, 1838)
- Allocotocerus magnus Hebauer, 2002
- Allocotocerus mistus (Orchymont, 1939)
- Allocotocerus muelleri (Kirsch, 1875)
- Allocotocerus myronius (Orchymont, 1939)
- Allocotocerus narayanus Hebauer, 2002
- Allocotocerus nigellus Chûjô & Satô, 1964
- Allocotocerus nitidus (Guérin-Méneville, 1834)
- Allocotocerus punctatus (Blackburn, 1888)
- Allocotocerus segrex (Orchymont, 1939)
- Allocotocerus semirotundus (Orchymont, 1939)
- Allocotocerus senectus (Orchymont, 1939)
- Allocotocerus seriatus (Régimbart, 1906)
- Allocotocerus simplex (Régimbart, 1906)
- Allocotocerus sisarus (Orchymont, 1939)
- Allocotocerus sobrinus (Orchymont, 1942)
- Allocotocerus soesilae (Makhan, 2007)
- Allocotocerus striatopunctatus (Laporte de Castelnau, 1840)
- Allocotocerus subaeneus (Erichson, 1843)
- Allocotocerus subditus (Orchymont, 1939)
- Allocotocerus subopacus (Régimbart, 1903)
- Allocotocerus tibialis (J.Balfour-Browne, 1939)
- Allocotocerus tubipennis (Jayaswal, 1972)
- Allocotocerus yalumbaboothbyi Watts, 1998
