= Berosus ordinatus =

Scientific classification
- Domain: Eukaryota
- Kingdom: Animalia
- Phylum: Arthropoda
- Class: Insecta
- Order: Coleoptera
- Suborder: Polyphaga
- Infraorder: Staphyliniformia
- Family: Hydrophilidae
- Genus: Berosus
- Species: B. ordinatus

Binomial name
- Berosus ordinatus (LeConte, 1855)

Species of beetle

Berosus ordinatus is a species of hydrophilid beetles native to the United States, specifically in the states of Maryland, Delaware, New York, New Jersey, Pennsylvania, Connecticut, and Rhode Island. It was originally described by John Lawrence LeConte in 1855 and is characterized by slightly divergent and prolonged elytral apices.
