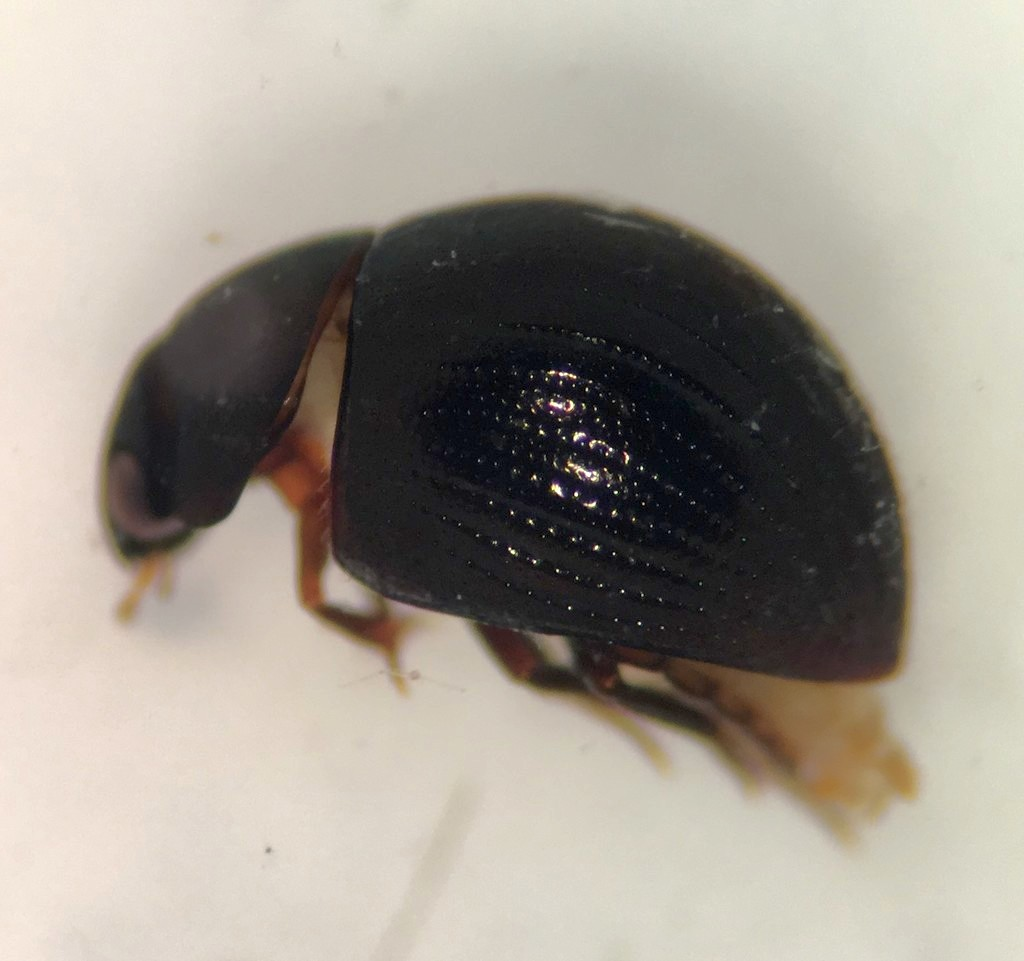
- Derallus altus

Scientific classification
- Kingdom: Animalia
- Phylum: Arthropoda
- Class: Insecta
- Order: Coleoptera
- Suborder: Polyphaga
- Infraorder: Staphyliniformia
- Family: Hydrophilidae
- Tribe: Berosini
- Genus: Derallus; Sharp, 1882

= Derallus =

Genus of beetles

Derallus is a genus of water scavenger beetles in the family Hydrophilidae. There are about six described species in Derallus.

== Species ==
These six species belong to the genus Derallus:

- Derallus altus (LeConte, 1855)
- Derallus ambitus d'Orchymont, 1940
- Derallus angustus Sharp, 1882
- Derallus intermedius Oliva, 1995
- Derallus rudis Sharp, 1882
- Derallus terraenovae Oliva, 1983
