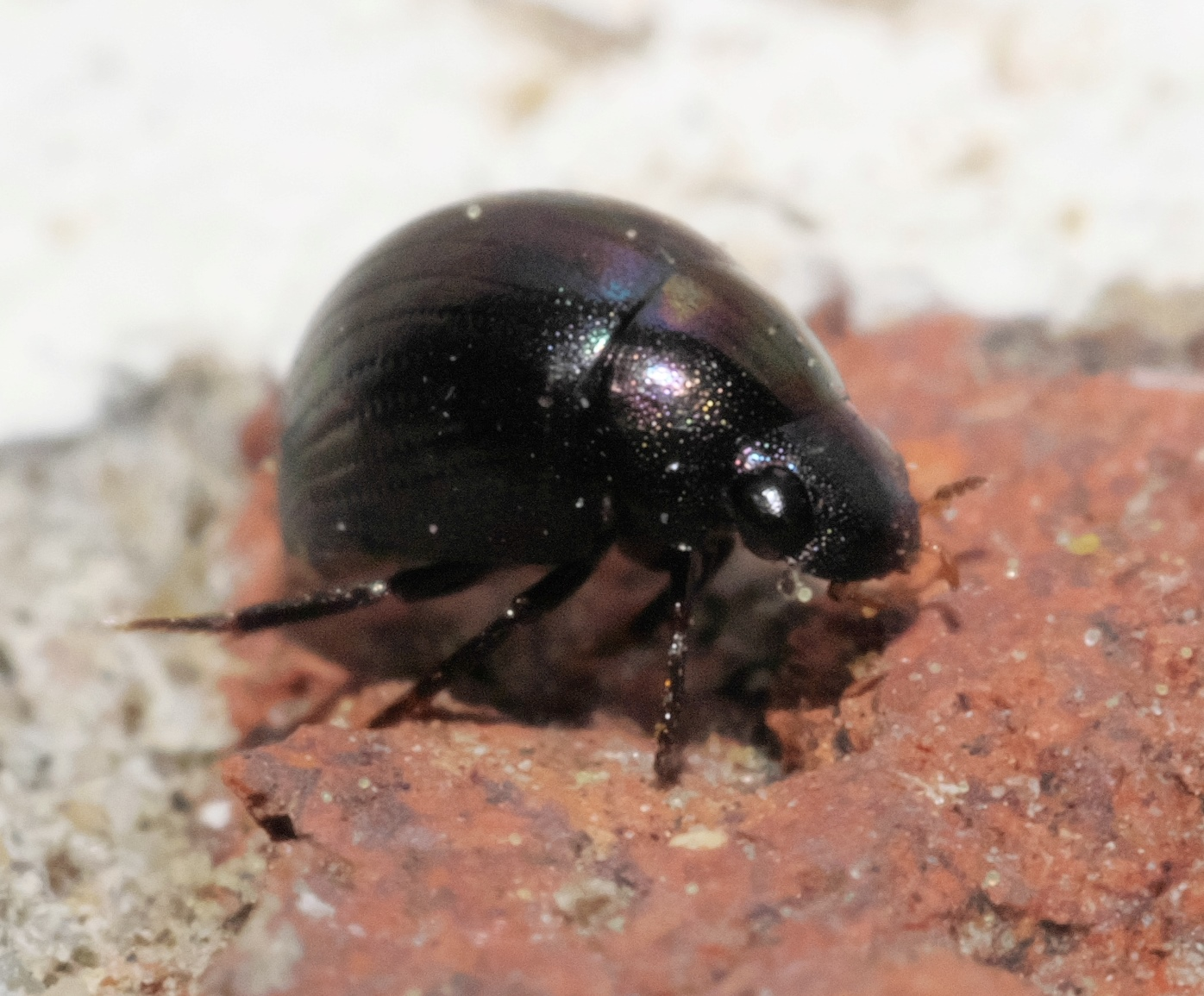
- Derallus altus, Oklahoma

Scientific classification
- Domain: Eukaryota
- Kingdom: Animalia
- Phylum: Arthropoda
- Class: Insecta
- Order: Coleoptera
- Suborder: Polyphaga
- Infraorder: Staphyliniformia
- Family: Hydrophilidae
- Genus: Derallus
- Species: D. altus

Binomial name
- Derallus altus (LeConte, 1855)

= Derallus altus =

Species of beetle

Derallus altus is a species of water scavenger beetle in the family Hydrophilidae. It is found in the Caribbean, North America, and South America.
