= Berosus corrini =

Scientific classification
- Domain: Eukaryota
- Kingdom: Animalia
- Phylum: Arthropoda
- Class: Insecta
- Order: Coleoptera
- Suborder: Polyphaga
- Infraorder: Staphyliniformia
- Family: Hydrophilidae
- Genus: Berosus
- Species: B. corrini

Binomial name
- Berosus corrini Wooldridge, 1964

Species of beetle

Berosus corrini is a species of hydrophilid beetles native to the United States. It was originally described by David P. Wooldridge in 1964 and is characterized by the lack of striae on its elytra, larger size, two projections on its sternal emargination, and laterally-projecting dorsal edges on the parameres.
