= Allocotocerus yalumbaboothbyi =

Scientific classification
- Kingdom: Animalia
- Phylum: Arthropoda
- Class: Insecta
- Order: Coleoptera
- Suborder: Polyphaga
- Infraorder: Staphyliniformia
- Family: Hydrophilidae
- Genus: Allocotocerus
- Species: A. yalumbaboothbyi

Binomial name
- Allocotocerus yalumbaboothbyi Watts, 1998
- Holotype site (SAMA 25-007769): Oenpelli, NT

Species of water beetle

Allocotocerus yalumbaboothbyi is a species of water beetle in the family Hydrophilidae, first described by Chris H.S. Watts in 1998.

Both larvae and adults are aquatic. The species is found in bodies of standing water, in the coastal zones of Western Australia and the Northern Territory.
