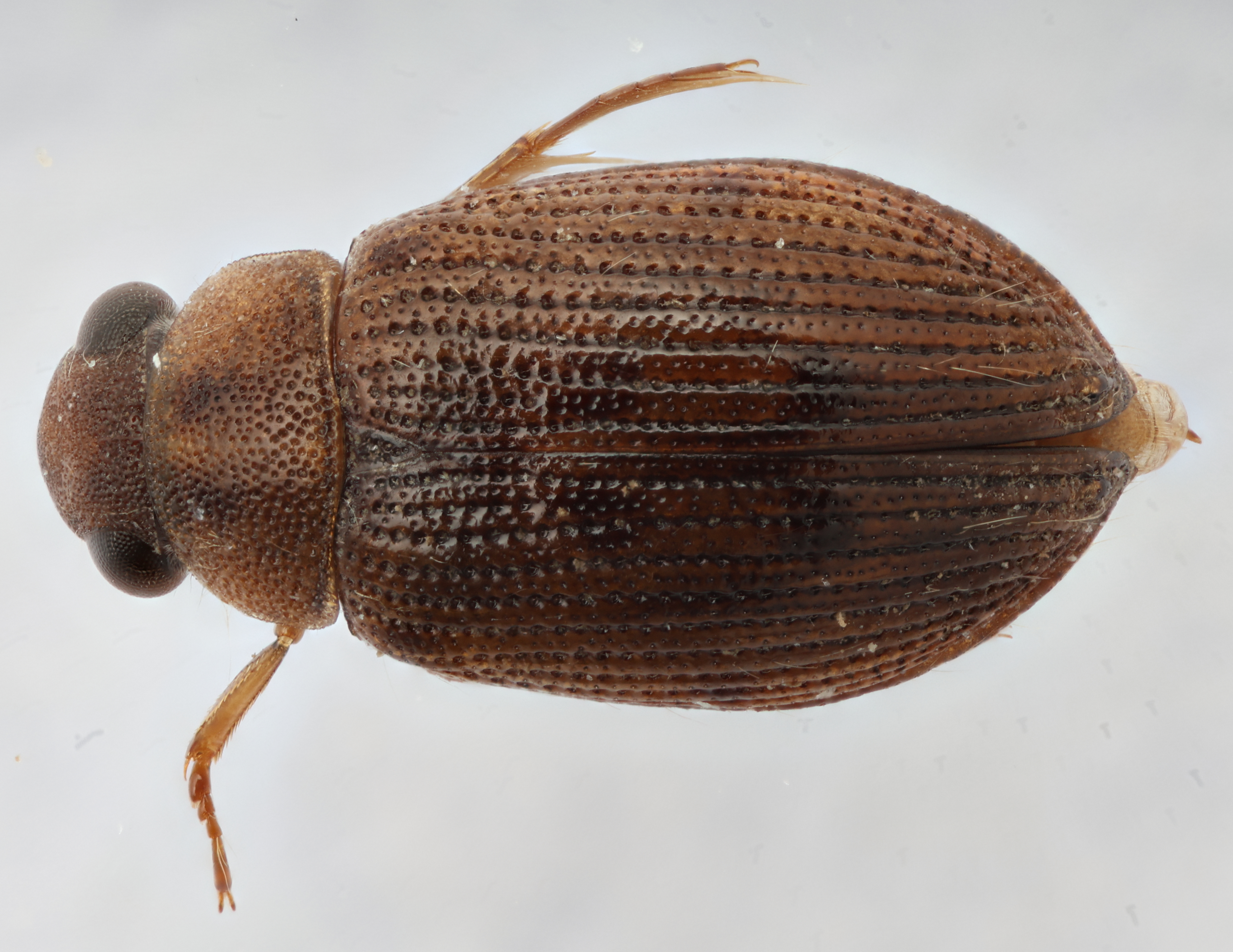

Scientific classification
- Kingdom: Animalia
- Phylum: Arthropoda
- Clade: Pancrustacea
- Class: Insecta
- Order: Coleoptera
- Suborder: Polyphaga
- Infraorder: Staphyliniformia
- Family: Hydrophilidae
- Genus: Berosus
- Species: B. aculeatus

Binomial name
- Berosus aculeatus LeConte, 1855

= Berosus aculeatus =

Species of beetle

Berosus aculeatus is a species of hydrophilid beetle native to the United States and Cuba. It was originally described by John Lawrence LeConte in 1855 and is characterized by prolonged apices of its elytra.
