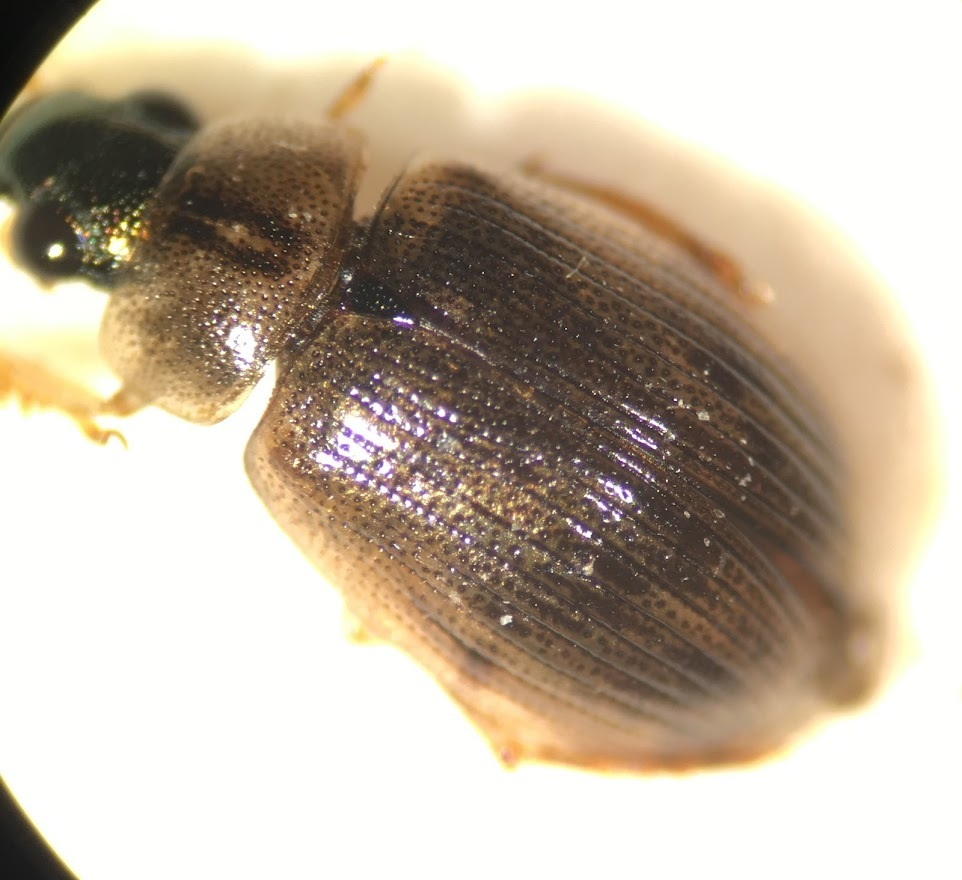
- Berosus fraternus, Mississippi, photo by Matthew Pintar

Scientific classification
- Domain: Eukaryota
- Kingdom: Animalia
- Phylum: Arthropoda
- Class: Insecta
- Order: Coleoptera
- Suborder: Polyphaga
- Infraorder: Staphyliniformia
- Family: Hydrophilidae
- Genus: Berosus
- Species: B. fraternus

Binomial name
- Berosus fraternus LeConte, 1855

Synonyms
- Berosus californicus Motschulsky, 1859

= Berosus fraternus =

Species of beetle

Berosus fraternus is a species of water scavenger beetle in the family Hydrophilidae. It is found in North America.
