= Berosus trilobus =

Scientific classification
- Domain: Eukaryota
- Kingdom: Animalia
- Phylum: Arthropoda
- Class: Insecta
- Order: Coleoptera
- Suborder: Polyphaga
- Infraorder: Staphyliniformia
- Family: Hydrophilidae
- Genus: Berosus
- Species: B. trilobus

Binomial name
- Berosus trilobus Chevrolat, 1863

Species of beetle

Berosus trilobus is a species of hydrophilid beetles from the Dominican Republic and Cuba.
