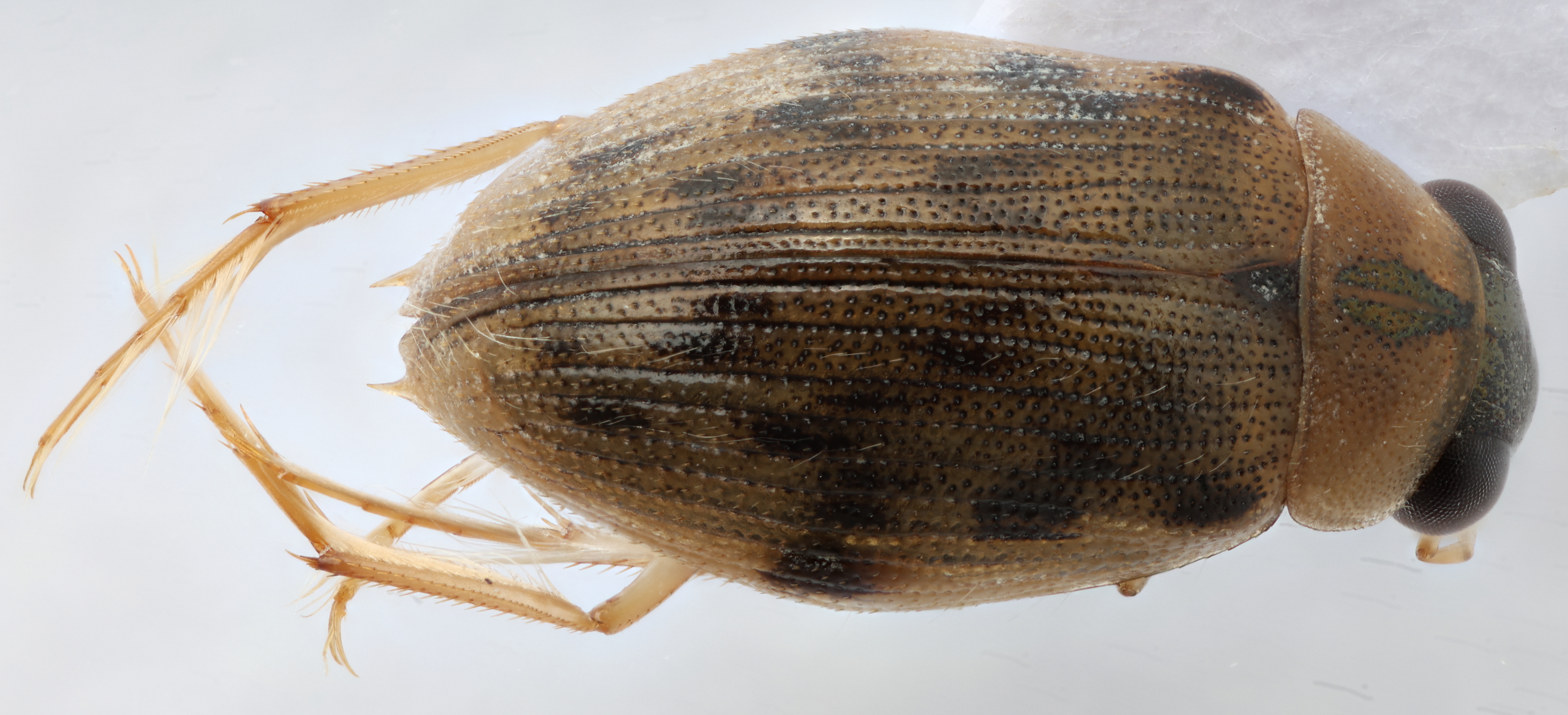

Scientific classification
- Kingdom: Animalia
- Phylum: Arthropoda
- Clade: Pancrustacea
- Class: Insecta
- Order: Coleoptera
- Suborder: Polyphaga
- Infraorder: Staphyliniformia
- Family: Hydrophilidae
- Genus: Berosus
- Species: B. pugnax

Binomial name
- Berosus pugnax (LeConte, 1863)

= Berosus pugnax =

Species of beetle

Berosus pugnax is a species of hydrophilid beetles native to the United States. It was originally described by John Lawrence LeConte in 1863 and is characterized by having emarginate apices on its elytra.
