= Berosus hatchi =

Scientific classification
- Domain: Eukaryota
- Kingdom: Animalia
- Phylum: Arthropoda
- Class: Insecta
- Order: Coleoptera
- Suborder: Polyphaga
- Infraorder: Staphyliniformia
- Family: Hydrophilidae
- Genus: Berosus
- Species: B. hatchi

Binomial name
- Berosus hatchi Miller, 1965

Species of beetle

Berosus hatchi is a species of water scavenger beetle in the family Hydrophilidae. It is found in North America.
