= Regimbartia attenuata =

Scientific classification
- Kingdom: Animalia
- Phylum: Arthropoda
- Class: Insecta
- Order: Coleoptera
- Suborder: Polyphaga
- Infraorder: Staphyliniformia
- Family: Hydrophilidae
- Genus: Regimbartia
- Species: R. attenuata

Binomial name
- Regimbartia attenuata (Fabricius, 1801)

Synonyms
- Brachygaster indicus Mulsant, 1853; Brachygaster metallescens Mulsant, 1853; Hydrophilus attenuatus Fabricius, 1801; Volvulus aeneus Brullé, 1835; Volvulus profundus Sharp, 1873; Volvulus scaphiformis Fairmaire, 1879

Species of beetle

Regimbartia attenuata, commonly known as Japanese water scavenger beetle, is a species of water scavenger beetle widely distributed in the Old World, from northern Australia and Japan westward to the countries of Arabian Peninsula, including Oman and Yemen. It is the only species of the genus occurring in the Arabian Peninsula.

== Distribution ==
It is found in India, Sri Lanka, Pakistan, Philippines, Sunda Islands, Australia, Japan, Formosa, Indonesia, Cambodia, Cochin-china, and Indochina.

== Description ==
The larval stage of the species is extensively described. Adult female lay eggs in egg cases on substrate such as leaves. Larva has almost symmetrical clypeolabrum, elongated prementum. Third instar larva is metapneustic. Body slender with strong setiferous projections. Thorax and abdomen consists with short to long, membranous projections. Body greyish white in color with brownish sclerotised parts. Head capsule is yellowish brown which is subquadrate, attenuated posteriad. Cervical sclerites are large, and subrectangular. Long, slender antenna with 3 segments. Mandibles slender, and slightly asymmetrical. Maxilla consists with 6-segments, and are slightly longer than antenna. Thoracic membrane covered with fine cuticular pubescence. Abdomen with 10 segments and tapering posteriorly. There are 12 setiferous, membranous projections on abdomen.

Adult beetles have antennae composed of 8 segments (5+3).

== Biology ==
The species is an important link in the diet of many amphibians. Adult beetles were easily eaten by the frog species Pelophylax nigromaculatus, but about 90% of swallowed beetles are excreted quickly. Surprisingly, the beetles survive. Water beetles carry oxygen under their exoskeleton. The exoskeleton protects the beetle from digestive juices in the frog. It allows the beetle to survive in the digestive system of the frog.

Adult beetles are identified as the natural hosts of the fungus Autoicomyces falcifer. Adults are usually found from rabbit carcasses.
