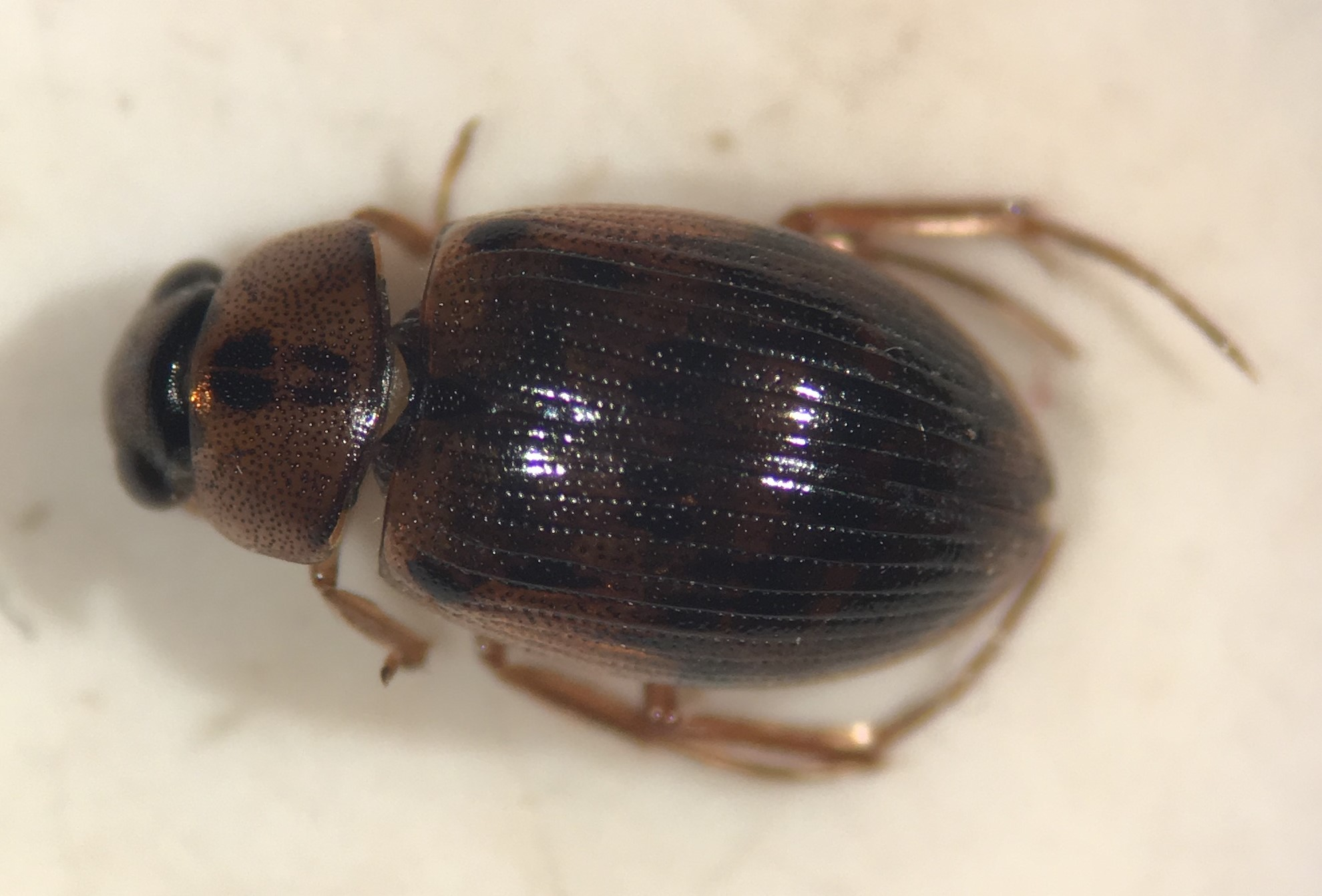

Scientific classification
- Domain: Eukaryota
- Kingdom: Animalia
- Phylum: Arthropoda
- Class: Insecta
- Order: Coleoptera
- Suborder: Polyphaga
- Infraorder: Staphyliniformia
- Family: Hydrophilidae
- Genus: Berosus
- Species: B. sayi

Binomial name
- Berosus sayi Hansen, 1999

Synonyms
- Berosus striatus

= Berosus sayi =

Species of beetle

Berosus sayi is a species of hydrophilid beetles native to the United States. It is a synonym of Berosus striatus, which was originally described by Thomas Say in 1825, and females can be characterized by a small tooth on the suture near the apex of each elytron.
