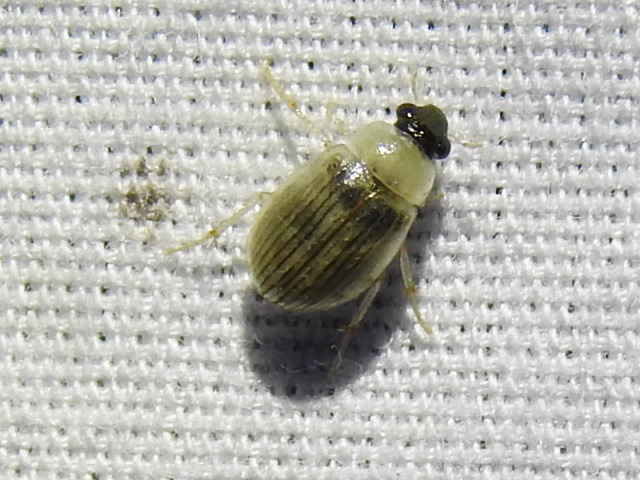
- In Texas, US

Scientific classification
- Kingdom: Animalia
- Phylum: Arthropoda
- Clade: Pancrustacea
- Class: Insecta
- Order: Coleoptera
- Suborder: Polyphaga
- Infraorder: Staphyliniformia
- Family: Hydrophilidae
- Genus: Berosus
- Species: B. metalliceps

Binomial name
- Berosus metalliceps Sharp, 1882

= Berosus metalliceps =

Species of beetle

Berosus metalliceps is a species of hydrophilid beetles from the United States, Mexico, the Bahamas and Cuba.
