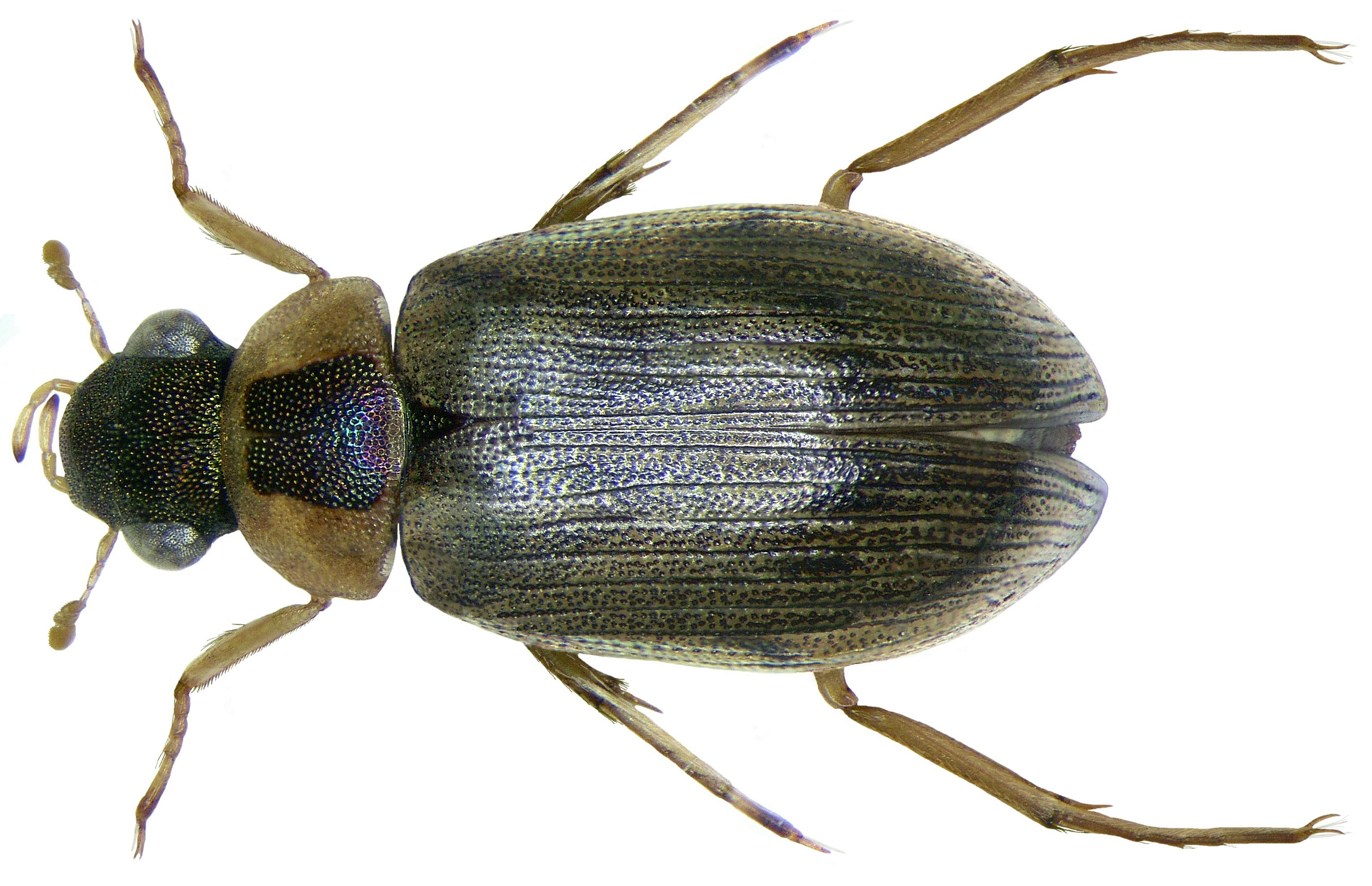
- Berosus affinis

Scientific classification
- Domain: Eukaryota
- Kingdom: Animalia
- Phylum: Arthropoda
- Class: Insecta
- Order: Coleoptera
- Suborder: Polyphaga
- Infraorder: Staphyliniformia
- Family: Hydrophilidae
- Subfamily: Hydrophilinae
- Tribe: Berosini; Mulsant, 1844

= Berosini =

Tribe of beetles

Berosini is a tribe of Hydrophilinae and contains 364 species in 5 genera.

== Genera ==
After Short and Fikáček (2011).

- Allocotocerus
- Berosus
- Derallus
- Hemiosus
- Regimbartia
