= Berosus interstitialis =

Scientific classification
- Domain: Eukaryota
- Kingdom: Animalia
- Phylum: Arthropoda
- Class: Insecta
- Order: Coleoptera
- Suborder: Polyphaga
- Infraorder: Staphyliniformia
- Family: Hydrophilidae
- Genus: Berosus
- Species: B. interstitialis

Binomial name
- Berosus interstitialis Knisch, 1924

Synonyms
- Berosus tessellatus Fletiaux & Sallé, 1889 non Motschulsky, 1859; Berosus stribalus Orchymont, 1946

Species of beetle

Berosus interstitialis is a species of hydrophilid beetles from the Bahamas, Haiti, Guadeloupe, the U.S. Virgin Islands, Puerto Rico and Cuba.
