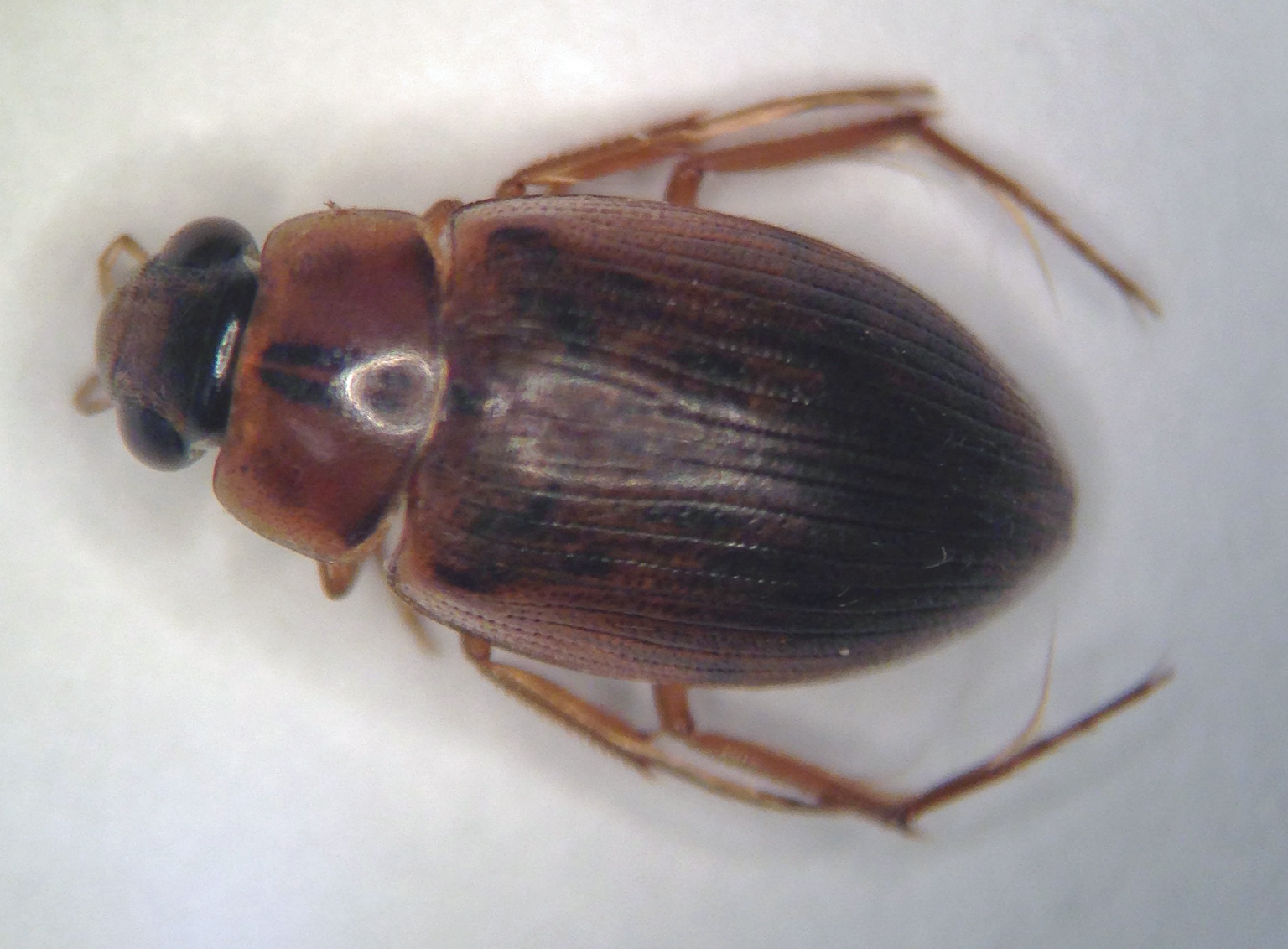

Scientific classification
- Domain: Eukaryota
- Kingdom: Animalia
- Phylum: Arthropoda
- Class: Insecta
- Order: Coleoptera
- Suborder: Polyphaga
- Infraorder: Staphyliniformia
- Family: Hydrophilidae
- Genus: Berosus
- Species: B. infuscatus

Binomial name
- Berosus infuscatus LeConte, 1855

= Berosus infuscatus =

Species of beetle

Berosus infuscatus is a species of hydrophilid beetle from the United States, Mexico and Cuba.

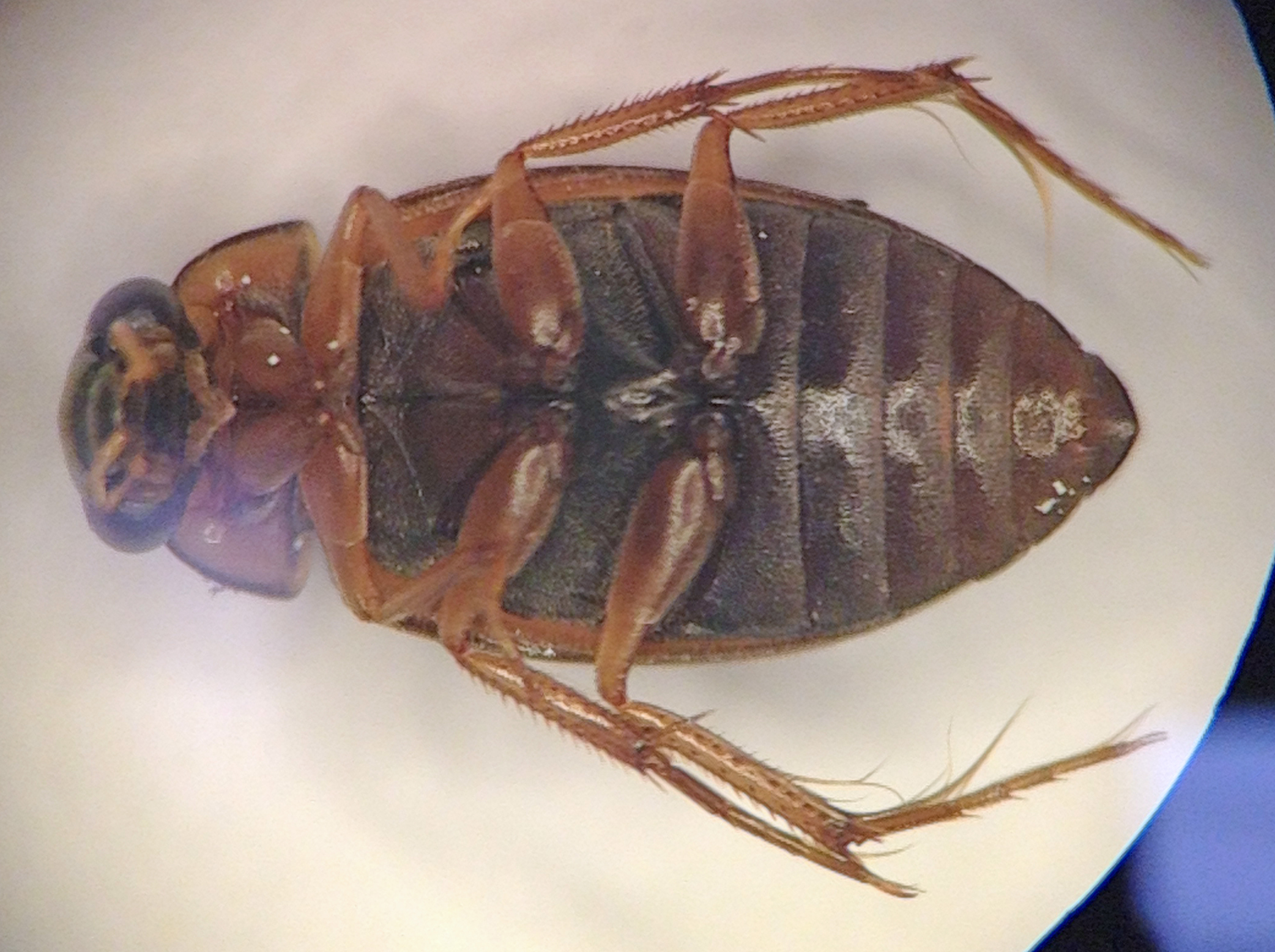
Ventral view of an adult Berosus infuscatus

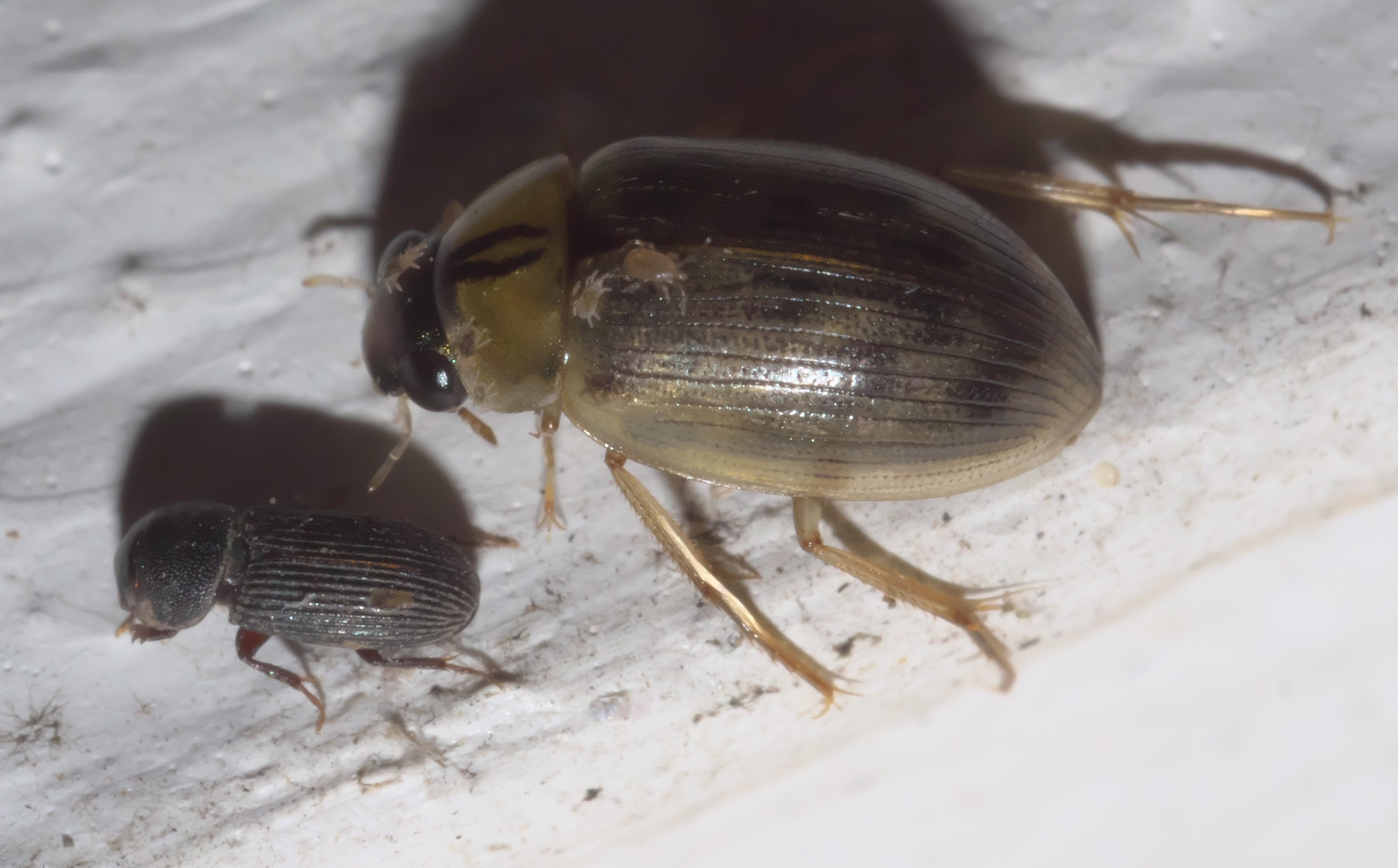
Berosus infuscatus, Oklahoma
