= Berosus quadridens =

Scientific classification
- Domain: Eukaryota
- Kingdom: Animalia
- Phylum: Arthropoda
- Class: Insecta
- Order: Coleoptera
- Suborder: Polyphaga
- Infraorder: Staphyliniformia
- Family: Hydrophilidae
- Genus: Berosus
- Species: B. quadridens

Binomial name
- Berosus quadridens Chevrolat, 1863

Species of beetle

Berosus quadridens is a species of hydrophilid beetles from Mexico, Guatemala, Nicaragua, Costa Rica and Cuba. It was previously considered a synonym of Berosus truncatipennis.
