= Berosus amoenus =

Scientific classification
- Domain: Eukaryota
- Kingdom: Animalia
- Phylum: Arthropoda
- Class: Insecta
- Order: Coleoptera
- Suborder: Polyphaga
- Infraorder: Staphyliniformia
- Family: Hydrophilidae
- Genus: Berosus
- Species: B. amoenus

Binomial name
- Berosus amoenus Watts, 1987

Synonyms
- Berosus (Enoplurus) amoenus Watts, 1987

Species of beetle

Holotype site: Koongarra, NT'"`UNIQ--ref-00000008-QINU`"'

Berosus amoenus is a species of hydrophilid beetle endemic to the Northern Territory (Australia) which was first described in 1987 by Chris H.S. Watts.
