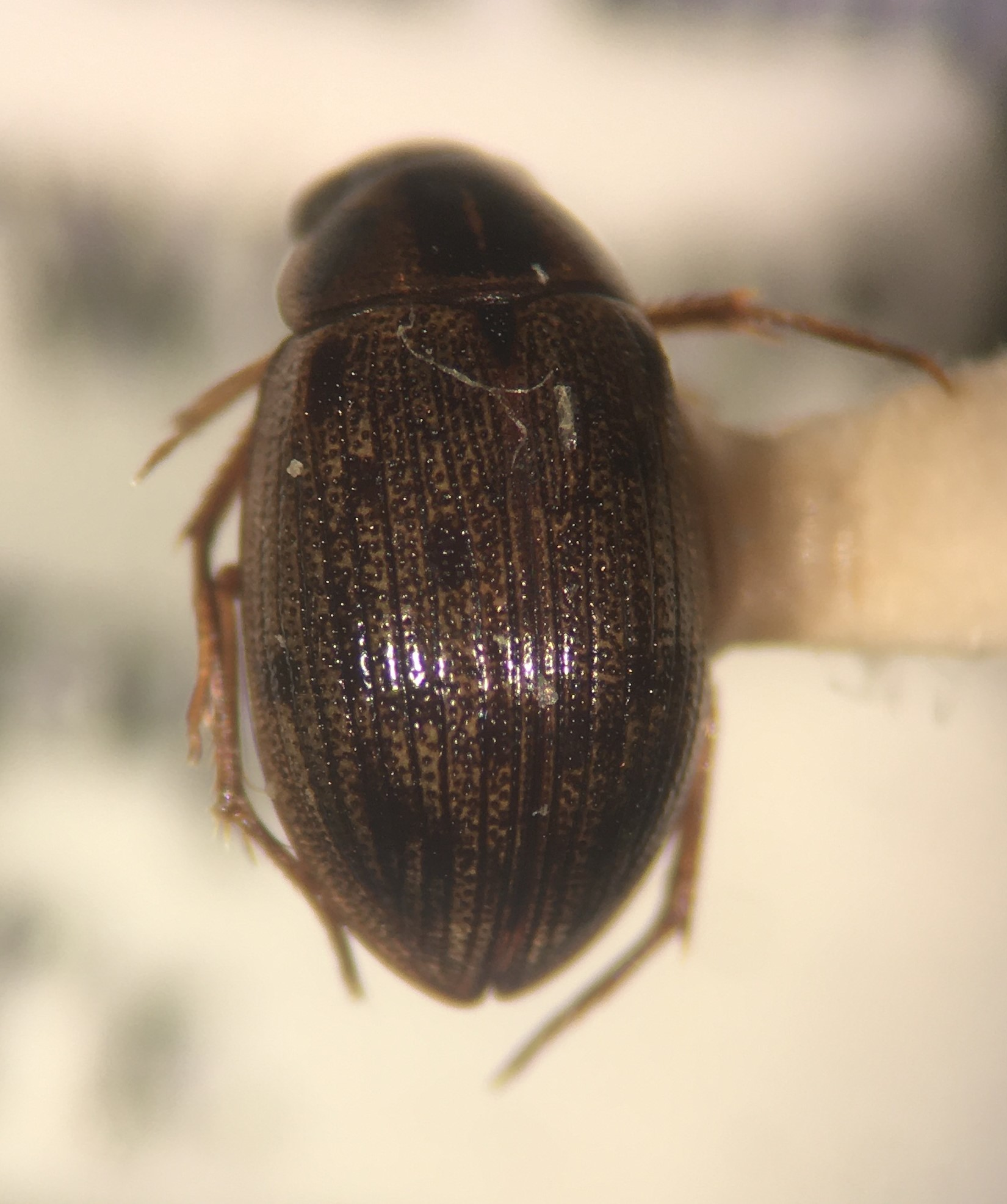
- Berosus youngi, Everglades National Park, Florida, photo by Matthew Pintar

Scientific classification
- Domain: Eukaryota
- Kingdom: Animalia
- Phylum: Arthropoda
- Class: Insecta
- Order: Coleoptera
- Suborder: Polyphaga
- Infraorder: Staphyliniformia
- Family: Hydrophilidae
- Genus: Berosus
- Species: B. youngi

Binomial name
- Berosus youngi Wooldridge, 1964

= Berosus youngi =

Species of beetle

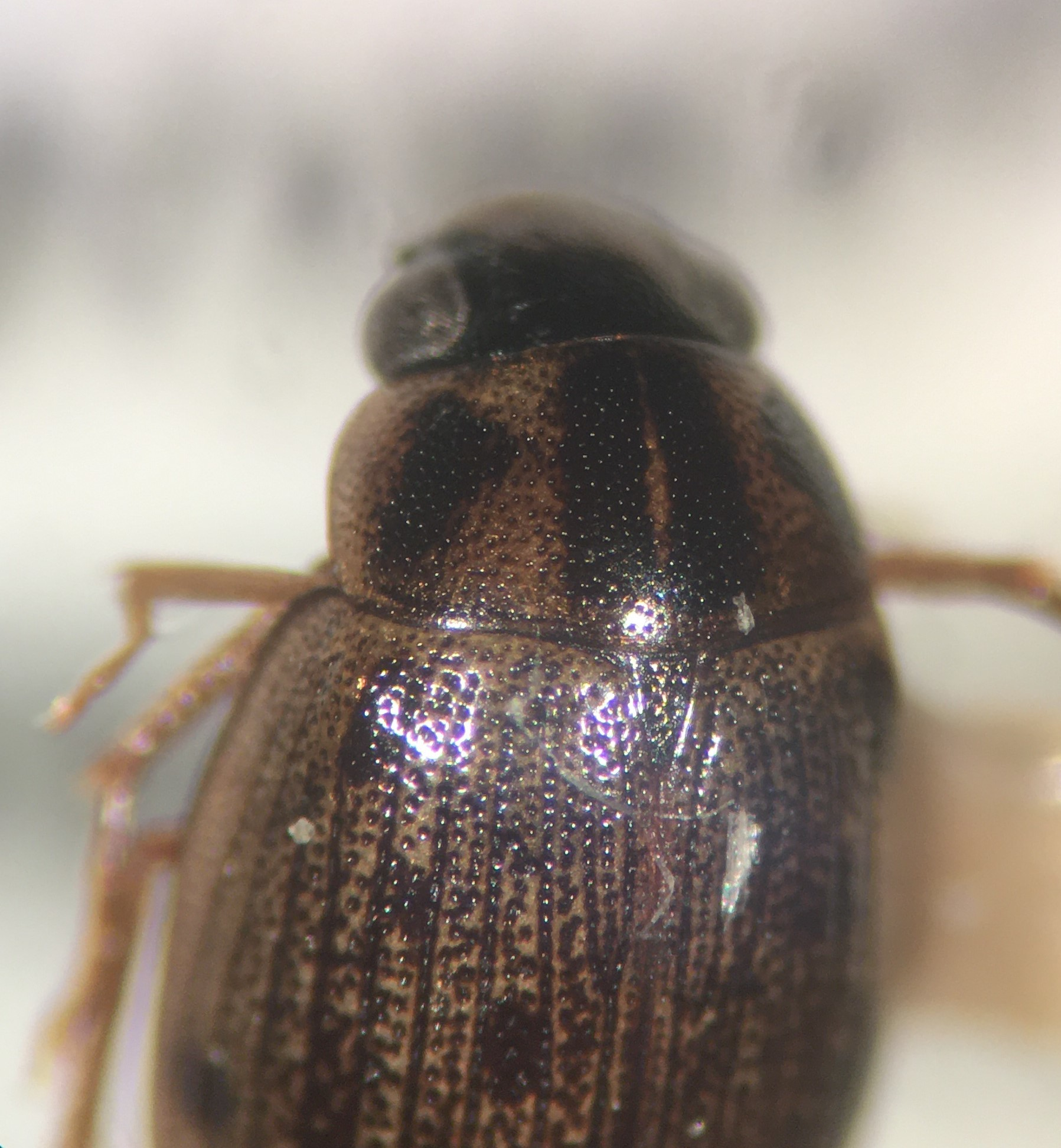
Berosus youngi, Everglades National Park, Florida, photo by Matthew Pintar

Berosus youngi is a species of water scavenger beetle found in the United States.

This species can be distinguished from other members of Berosus in the eastern United States by the somewhat triangular black spots on the sides of the pronotum. Its length has been measured at about 4 mm.
