= Berosus chevrolati =

Scientific classification
- Kingdom: Animalia
- Phylum: Arthropoda
- Clade: Pancrustacea
- Class: Insecta
- Order: Coleoptera
- Suborder: Polyphaga
- Infraorder: Staphyliniformia
- Family: Hydrophilidae
- Genus: Berosus
- Species: B. chevrolati

Binomial name
- Berosus chevrolati Zaitzev, 1908

Synonyms
- Berosus aculeatus Chevrolat, 1863 non LeConte, 1855

Species of beetle

Berosus chevrolati is a species of hydrophilid beetles from Cuba.
