= Berosus undatus =

Scientific classification
- Kingdom: Animalia
- Phylum: Arthropoda
- Clade: Pancrustacea
- Class: Insecta
- Order: Coleoptera
- Suborder: Polyphaga
- Infraorder: Staphyliniformia
- Family: Hydrophilidae
- Genus: Berosus
- Species: B. undatus

Binomial name
- Berosus undatus (Fabricius, 1792)

Synonyms
- Hydrophilus undatus Fabricius, 1792

Species of beetle

Berosus undatus is a species of hydrophilid beetles from the United States, Mexico, the Lesser Antilles and Cuba.
