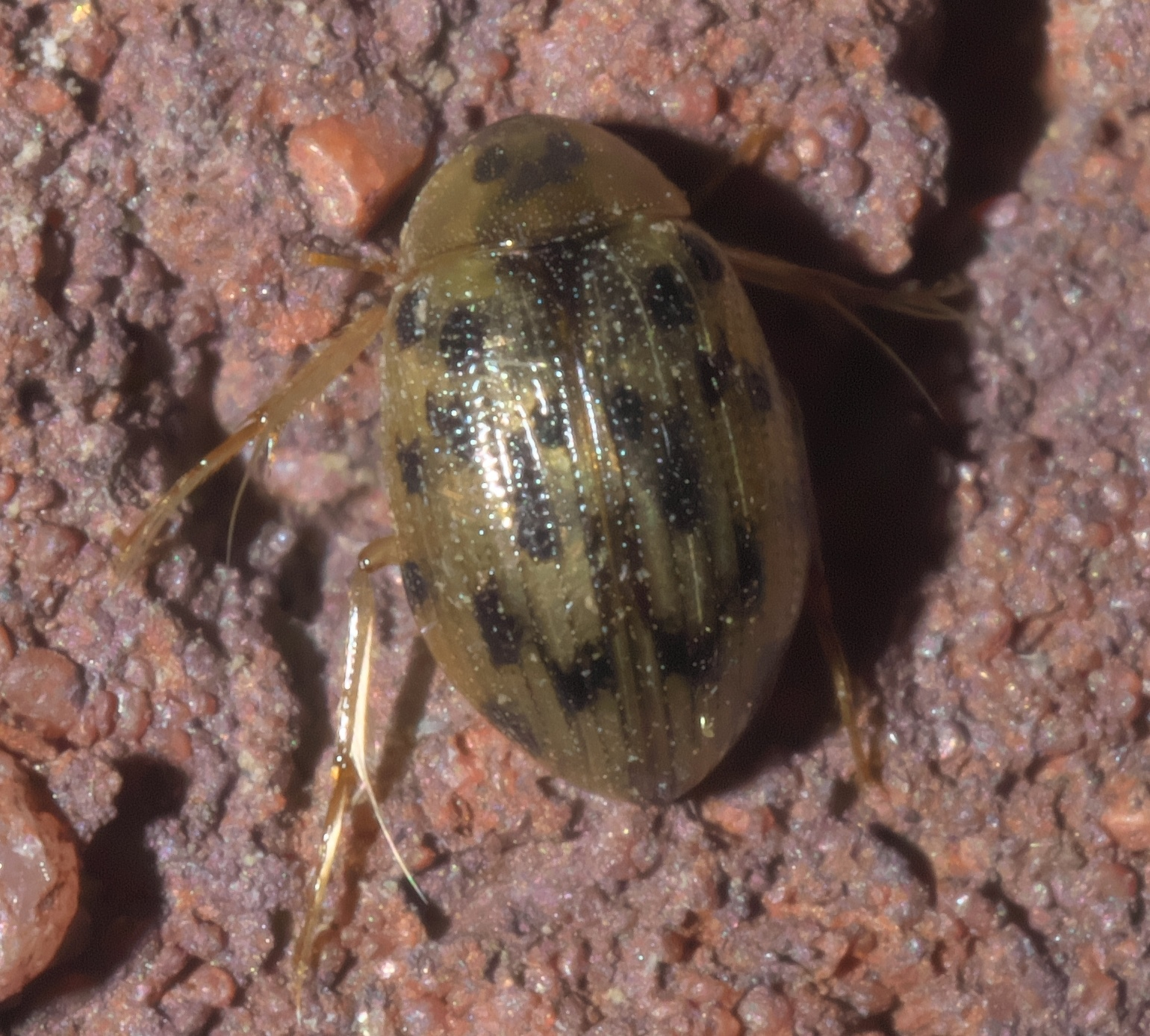

Scientific classification
- Domain: Eukaryota
- Kingdom: Animalia
- Phylum: Arthropoda
- Class: Insecta
- Order: Coleoptera
- Suborder: Polyphaga
- Infraorder: Staphyliniformia
- Family: Hydrophilidae
- Genus: Berosus
- Species: B. pantherinus

Binomial name
- Berosus pantherinus LeConte, 1855

= Berosus pantherinus =

Species of beetle

Berosus pantherinus is a species of hydrophilid beetle native to the United States. It was originally described by John Lawrence LeConte in 1855 and is characterized by having ten dark spots on each elytron.
