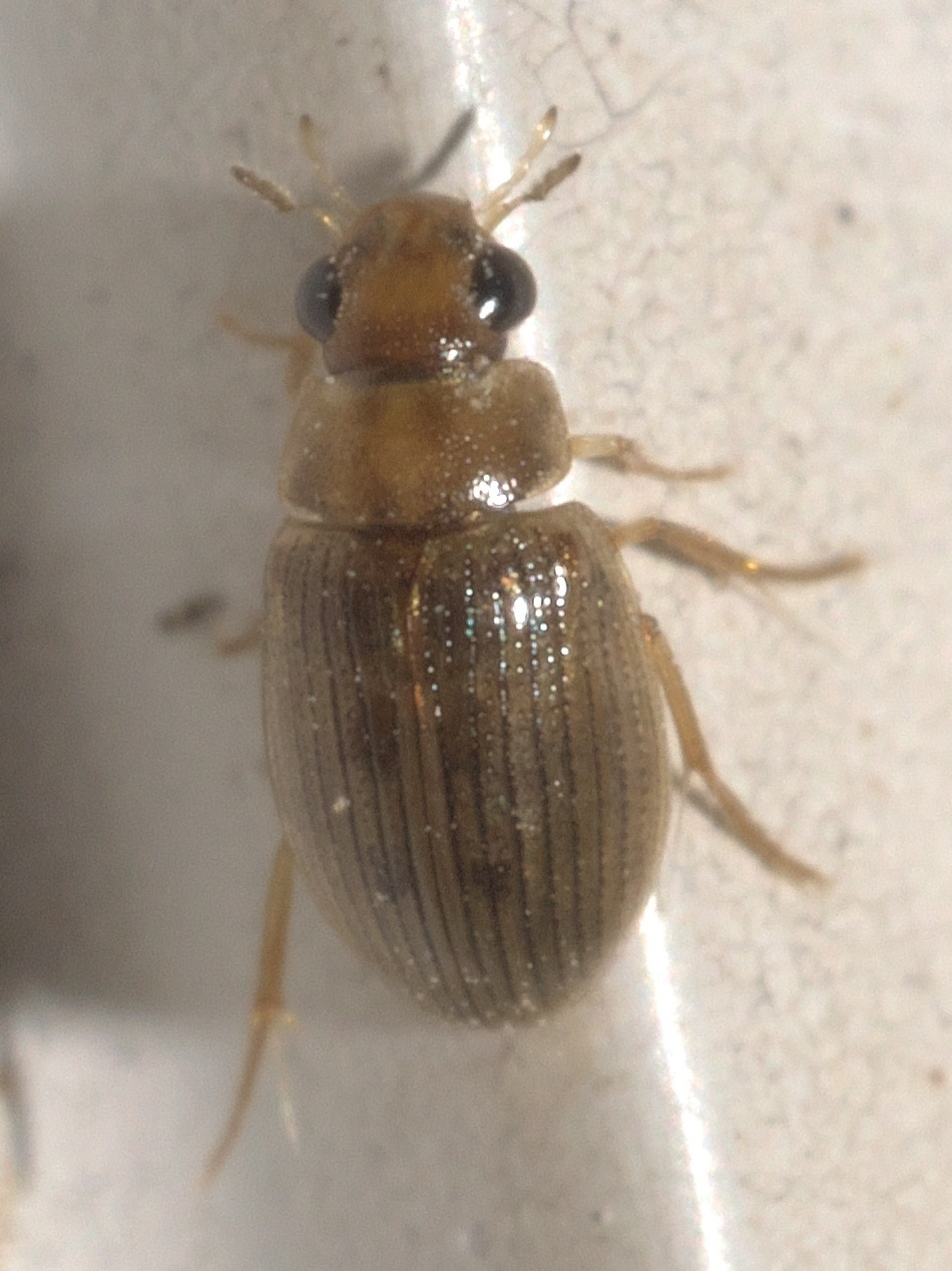
- Berosus exiguus, Oklahoma

Scientific classification
- Domain: Eukaryota
- Kingdom: Animalia
- Phylum: Arthropoda
- Class: Insecta
- Order: Coleoptera
- Suborder: Polyphaga
- Infraorder: Staphyliniformia
- Family: Hydrophilidae
- Genus: Berosus
- Species: B. exiguus

Binomial name
- Berosus exiguus (Say, 1825)

Synonyms
- Hydrophilus exiguus Say, 1825

= Berosus exiguus =

Species of beetle

Berosus exiguus is a species of water scavenger beetles found in the United States, the Bahamas, and Cuba. These beetles are small, ranging from 2.0 to 3.5 mm in length. They can be identified by their small size, yellowish-brown head, distinctly impressed elytral striae (stripes), and often faint spots on the elytra.
