= Berosus moerens =

Scientific classification
- Kingdom: Animalia
- Phylum: Arthropoda
- Class: Insecta
- Order: Coleoptera
- Suborder: Polyphaga
- Infraorder: Staphyliniformia
- Family: Hydrophilidae
- Genus: Berosus
- Species: B. moerens

Binomial name
- Berosus moerens Sharp, 1882

Species of beetle

Berosus moerens is a species of water scavenger beetle in the family Hydrophilidae. It is found in Central America.
