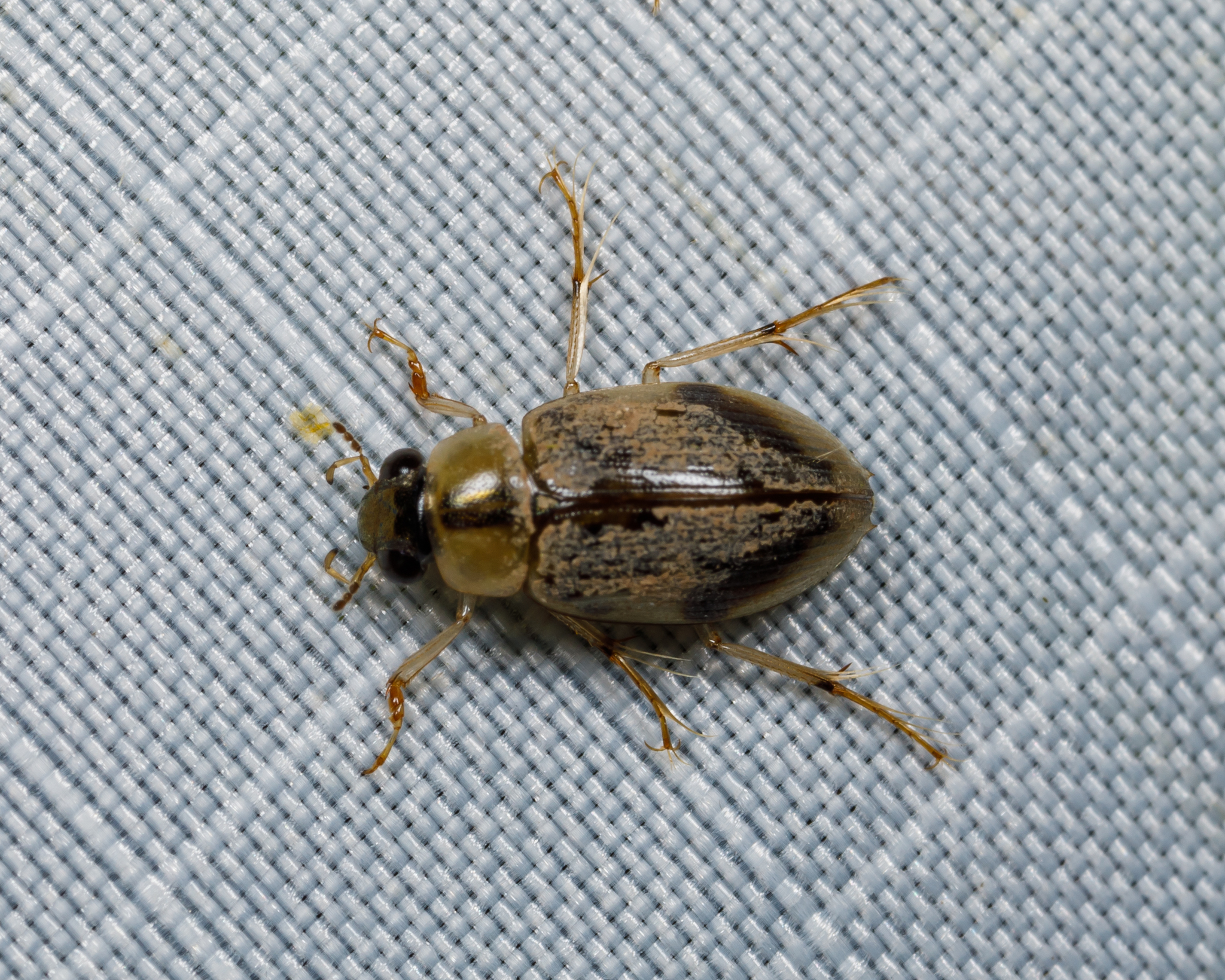
- Berosus miles, Texas

Scientific classification
- Domain: Eukaryota
- Kingdom: Animalia
- Phylum: Arthropoda
- Class: Insecta
- Order: Coleoptera
- Suborder: Polyphaga
- Infraorder: Staphyliniformia
- Family: Hydrophilidae
- Genus: Berosus
- Species: B. miles

Binomial name
- Berosus miles LeConte, 1855

= Berosus miles =

Species of beetle

Berosus miles is a species of water scavenger beetle in the family Hydrophilidae. It is found in Central America and North America.
