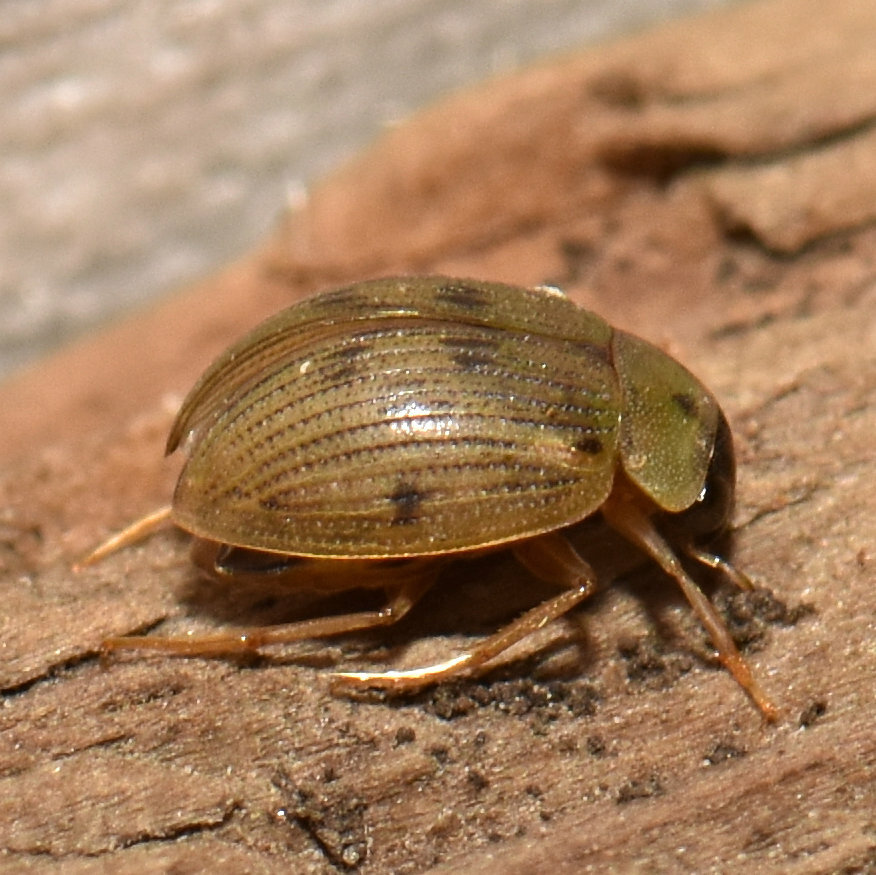
- Berosus peregrinus, Canada

Scientific classification
- Kingdom: Animalia
- Phylum: Arthropoda
- Class: Insecta
- Order: Coleoptera
- Suborder: Polyphaga
- Infraorder: Staphyliniformia
- Family: Hydrophilidae
- Genus: Berosus
- Species: B. peregrinus

Binomial name
- Berosus peregrinus (Herbst, 1797)

Synonyms
- Hydrophilus peregrinus Herbst, 1797

= Berosus peregrinus =

Species of beetle

Berosus peregrinus is a species of hydrophilid beetles from Canada, the United States and Cuba. One species of water scavenger beetle that is a member of the Hydrophilidae family is Berosus peregrinus. It usually lives in watery habitats like as marshes, ponds, and sluggish streams. Like other species in its genus, it’s adapted to life in water and plays a role in decomposing organic material.
