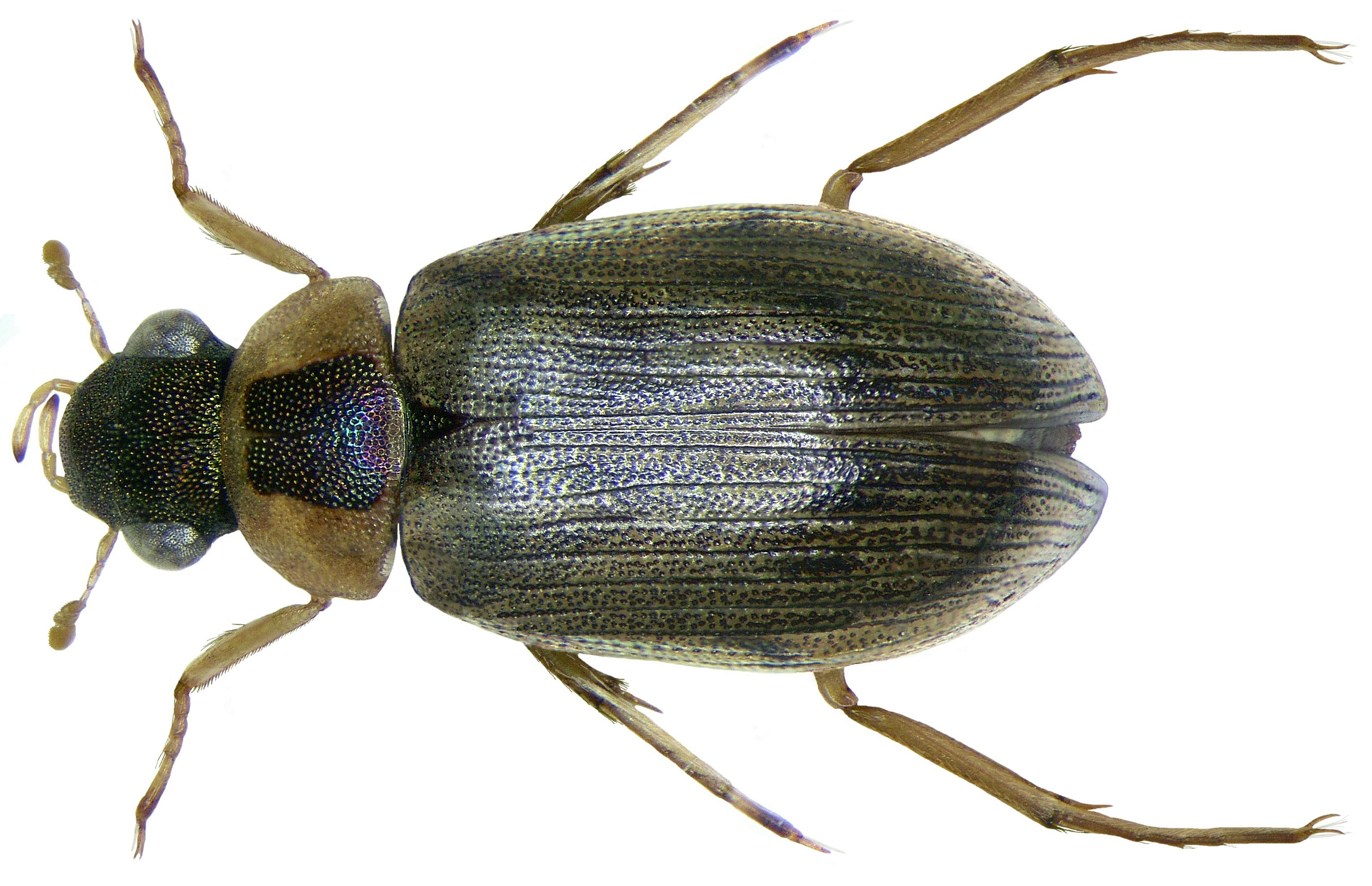
- Berosus affinis

Scientific classification
- Kingdom: Animalia
- Phylum: Arthropoda
- Class: Insecta
- Order: Coleoptera
- Suborder: Polyphaga
- Infraorder: Staphyliniformia
- Family: Hydrophilidae
- Subfamily: Hydrophilinae
- Tribe: Berosini
- Genus: Berosus; Leach, 1817

= Berosus (beetle) =

Genus of beetles

Berosus is a genus of beetles in the family Hydrophilidae, the water scavenger beetles. The genus contains 273 species. It is distributed worldwide.

Beetles of this genus are aquatic, with most living in ponds and other marshy habitat types.

== Diversity ==
Species include:

- Berosus aculeatus LeConte, 1855
- Berosus affinis Brullé, 1835
- Berosus apure Oliva, 2002
- Berosus arnetti Van Tassell, 1990
- Berosus atlanticus Queney, 2007
- Berosus blechrus Leech, 1948
- Berosus chevrolati Zaitzev, 1908
- Berosus corrini Wooldridge, 1964
- Berosus degallieri Queney, 2010
- Berosus duquefi Queney, 2006
- Berosus dolerosus Leech, 1948
- Berosus exiguus Say, 1825
- Berosus fischeri Schödl, 1993
- Berosus fraternus LeConte, 1855
- Berosus guyanensis Queney, 2006
- Berosus hatchi Miller, 1965
- Berosus hoplites Sharp, 1887
- Berosus infuscatus LeConte, 1855
- Berosus ingeminatus Orchymont, 1946
- Berosus interstitialis Knisch, 1924
- Berosus maculosus Mannerheim, 1853
- Berosus metalliceps Sharp, 1882
- Berosus miles LeConte, 1855
- Berosus moerens Sharp, 1882
- Berosus nigricollis Hebauer, 2006
- Berosus notopeltatus Van Tassell, 1963
- Berosus olivae Queney, 2006
- Berosus ordinatus LeConte, 1855
- Berosus oregonensis Miller, 1965
- Berosus pantherinus LeConte, 1855
- Berosus peregrinus Herbst, 1797
- Berosus pugnax LeConte, 1863
- Berosus punctatissimus LeConte, 1855
- Berosus quadridens Chevrolat, 1863
- Berosus rugulosus Horn, 1873
- Berosus salvini Sharp, 1882
- Berosus sayi Hansen, 1999
- Berosus spiniger Queney, 2010
- Berosus stylifer Horn, 1873
- Berosus trilobus Chevrolat, 1863
- Berosus truncatipennis Castelnau, 1840
- Berosus tayouanus Ueng, Wang & Wang, 2007
- Berosus undatus Fabricius, 1792
- Berosus youngi Wooldridge, 1964

Additional Australian species:

- Berosus arcus Watts, 1987
- Berosus juxtadiscolor Watts, 1987
- Berosus macropunctatus Watts, 1987
- Berosus niger Watts, 1987
- Berosus quadrapunctatus Watts, 1987
- Berosus ralphi Watts, 1987
- Berosus reardoni Watts, 1987
- Berosus sarahae Watts, 1987
- Berosus timmsi Watts, 1987
- Berosus trishae Watts, 1987
- Berosus wadeae Watts, 1987
- Berosus amoenus Watts, 1987
- Berosus aquilo Watts, 1987
- Berosus dallasae Watts, 1987
- Berosus gibbae Watts, 1987
- Berosus josephenae Watts, 1987
- Berosus nicholasi Watts, 1987
- Berosus sadieae Watts, 1987
- Berosus sonjae Watts, 1987
- erosus veronicae Watts, 1987
- Berosus vijae Watts, 1987
