= Regimbartia =

Scientific classification
- Domain: Eukaryota
- Kingdom: Animalia
- Phylum: Arthropoda
- Class: Insecta
- Order: Coleoptera
- Suborder: Polyphaga
- Infraorder: Staphyliniformia
- Family: Hydrophilidae
- Genus: Regimbartia; Zaitzev, 1908

Diversity
- 10 species

Synonyms
- Volvulus Brullé, 1835 (Preocc.); Spheroides Hope, 1838 (Preocc.); Brachygaster Mulsant, 1853 (Preocc.)

Genus of beetles

Regimbartia is a small genus of beetles belonging to the family Hydrophilidae comprising ten species distributed throughout Africa, South Asia, South East Asia and Australia.

== Species ==
- Regimbartia attenuata (Fabricius, 1801)
- Regimbartia compressa (Boheman, 1851)
- Regimbartia condicta Orchymont, 1941
- Regimbartia denticulata (Mulsant, 1853)
- Regimbartia elliptica (Régimbart, 1906)
- Regimbartia inflata (Brullé, 1835)
- Regimbartia minima Orchymont, 1941
- Regimbartia nilotica (Sharp, 1904)
- Regimbartia obsoleta (Régimbart, 1906)
- Regimbartia sumatrensis Orchymont, 1941
