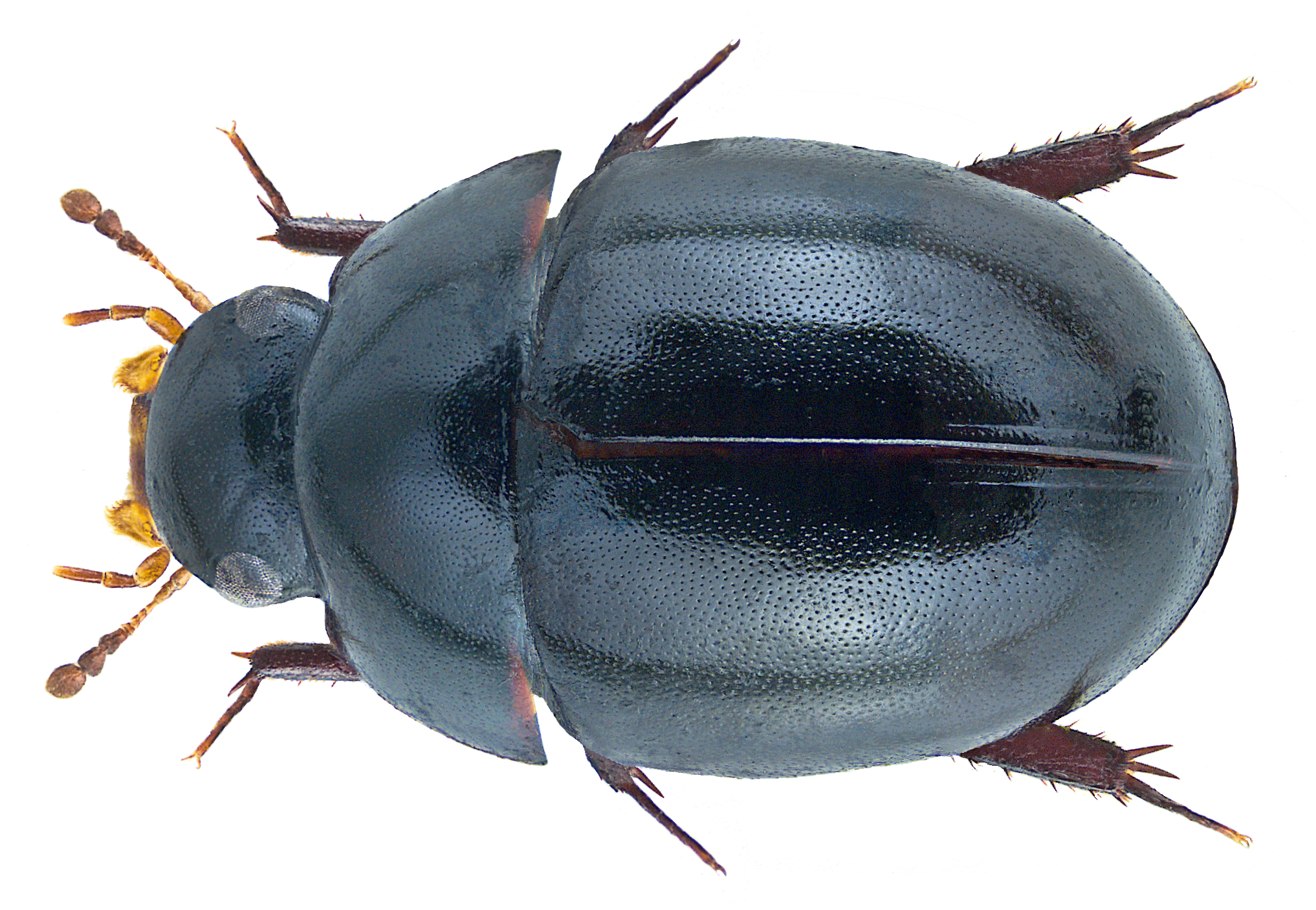
- Coelostoma vitalisi

Scientific classification
- Domain: Eukaryota
- Kingdom: Animalia
- Phylum: Arthropoda
- Class: Insecta
- Order: Coleoptera
- Suborder: Polyphaga
- Infraorder: Staphyliniformia
- Family: Hydrophilidae
- Subfamily: Sphaeridiinae
- Tribe: Coelostomatini
- Genus: Coelostoma; Brullé 1835

Subgenera
- Coelostoma; Hammacoelostoma Mouchamps, 1958; Holocoelostoma Mouchamps, 1958; Lachnocoelostoma Mouchamps, 1958

Diversity
- About 123 species

Synonyms
- Caelostoma Agassiz, 1846; Cyclonotum Erichson, 1837; Hammacoelostoma Mouchamps, 1958; Holocoelostoma Mouchamps, 1958

= Coelostoma =

Genus of beetles

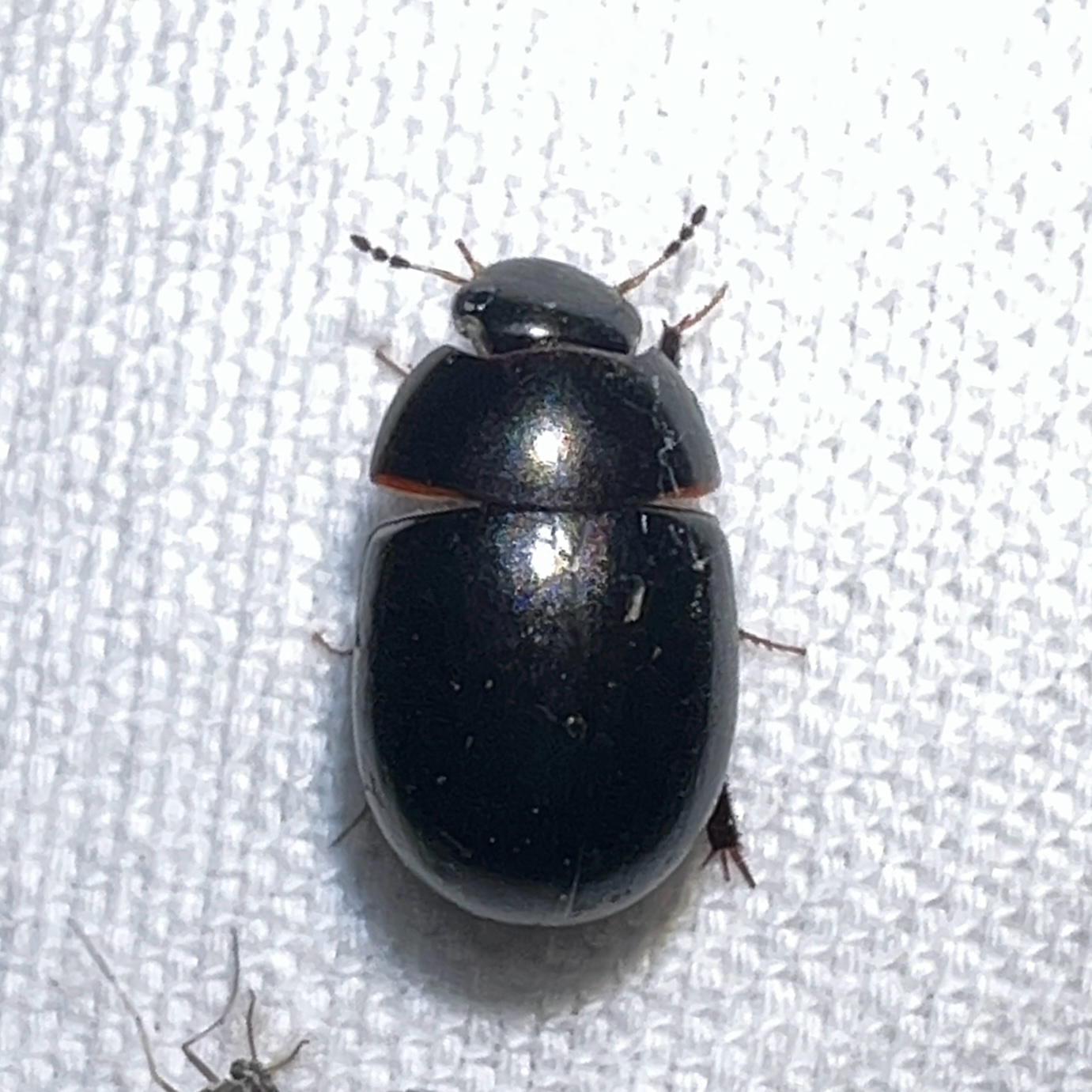
Coelostoma fabricii, Australia

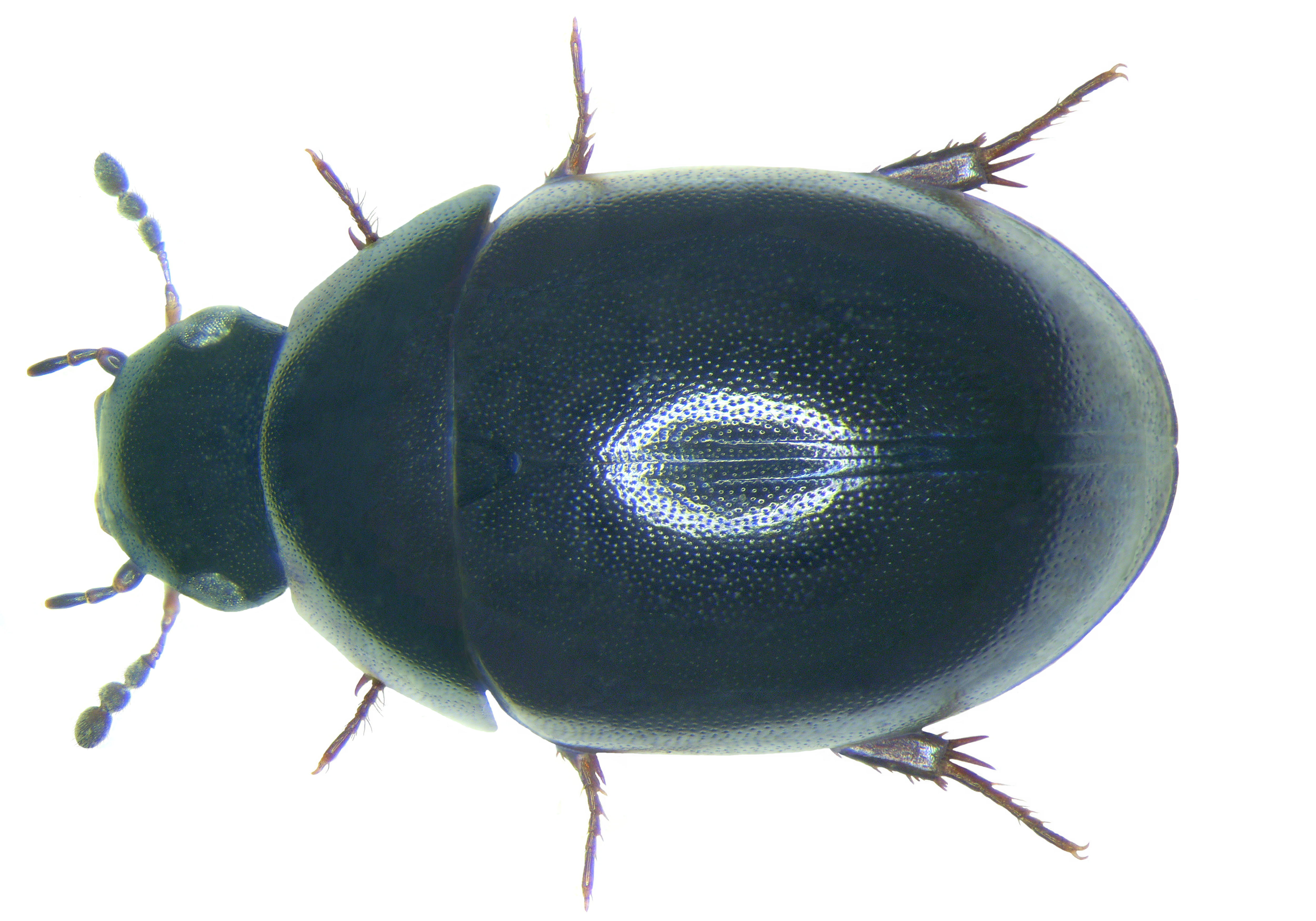
Coelostoma orbiculare

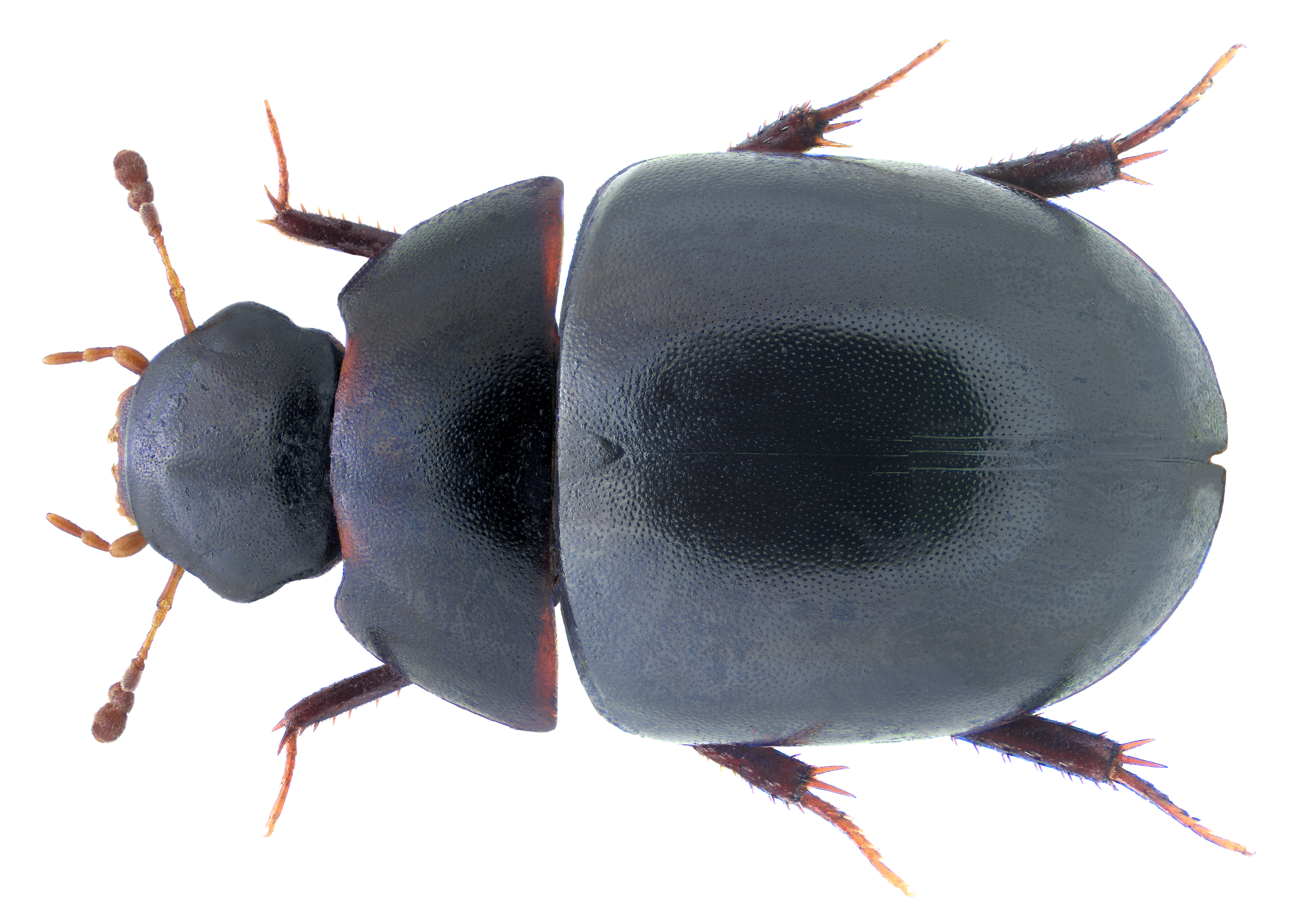
Coelostoma fallaciosum

Coelostoma is a genus of beetles belonging to the family Hydrophilidae. The genus was first described by Brullé in 1835. The genus has cosmopolitan distribution, with 111 described species, representing one of the most diverse genera of Hydrophilidae.

== Description ==
Body rather convex, brown to black. Eyes are medium in size, and deeply excised internally. Antenna consists with 9 antennomeres, and loosely segmented antennal club. Mesoventrite consists with an arrow-head shaped median elevation. Metaventrite is longer than mesoventral elevation. There are strongly raised median portion in Metaventrite broadly projecting anteriorly which become abutted to mesoventral process. Elytra lacking serial punctures.

== Species ==
These 123 species belong to the genus Coelostoma:

- Coelostoma aeneolum Régimbart, 1903
- Coelostoma aethiopicum Orchymont, 1936
- Coelostoma afflatum Knisch, 1922
- Coelostoma alluaudi Mouchamps, 1958
- Coelostoma anthracinum J.Balfour-Browne, 1939
- Coelostoma assinicum Mouchamps, 1958
- Coelostoma austrine Mouchamps, 1958
- Coelostoma balfourbrownei M.Hansen, 1999
- Coelostoma bannanicum Mai et al., 2022
- Coelostoma basilewskyi Mouchamps, 1958
- Coelostoma bechynei J.Balfour-Browne, 1959
- Coelostoma bhutanicum Jayaswal, 1972
- Coelostoma bibilense Hebauer, 2000
- Coelostoma bifidum Jia et al., 2014
- Coelostoma bipunctatum Jayaswal, 1972
- Coelostoma brachaurum Mouchamps, 1958
- Coelostoma brownei Mouchamps, 1958
- Coelostoma brunneum Mouchamps, 1958
- Coelostoma bullosum Mouchamps, 1958
- Coelostoma camerunense Mouchamps, 1958
- Coelostoma centrale Mouchamps, 1958
- Coelostoma collarti Mouchamps, 1958
- Coelostoma conradsi Orchymont, 1936
- Coelostoma coomani Orchymont, 1932
- Coelostoma cooptatum Orchymont, 1932
- Coelostoma coortum Orchymont, 1932
- Coelostoma dactylopunctum Mai et al., 2022
- Coelostoma dentatum Knisch, 1924
- Coelostoma deplexum J.Balfour-Browne, 1950
- Coelostoma diversum Orchymont, 1932
- Coelostoma dolum J.Balfour-Browne, 1950
- Coelostoma ealanum Orchymont, 1941
- Coelostoma edwardsi J.Balfour-Browne, 1940
- Coelostoma erinna J.Balfour-Browne, 1950
- Coelostoma escalerai Hernando, 1997
- Coelostoma fabricii (Montrouzier, 1860)
- Coelostoma fallaciosum Orchymont, 1936
- Coelostoma fortunum Mai et al., 2022
- Coelostoma freudei Mouchamps, 1958
- Coelostoma freyi Mouchamps, 1958
- Coelostoma gentilii Jia et al., 2014
- Coelostoma hajeki Jia et al., 2014
- Coelostoma himalayanum Hebauer, 2002
- Coelostoma hirsutum Mouchamps, 1958
- Coelostoma hispanicum (Küster, 1848)
- Coelostoma homalinum Hebauer, 2002
- Coelostoma hongkongense Jia et al., 2014
- Coelostoma horni (Régimbart, 1902)
- Coelostoma huangi Jia et al., 2014
- Coelostoma injuratum J.Balfour-Browne, 1952
- Coelostoma insidiosum Mouchamps, 1958
- Coelostoma insolitum Orchymont, 1936
- Coelostoma irregulare Hebauer, 2001
- Coelostoma jaculum Jia et al., 2019
- Coelostoma jaechi Jia et al., 2017
- Coelostoma jeanneli Mouchamps, 1958
- Coelostoma kantnerorum Hebauer, 2006
- Coelostoma lamottei J.Balfour-Browne, 1958
- Coelostoma lazarense Orchymont, 1925
- Coelostoma lemuriense Mouchamps, 1958
- Coelostoma leonense J.Balfour-Browne, 1939
- Coelostoma lesnei Orchymont, 1936
- Coelostoma lyratum Sheth, Ghate & Fikáček, 2020
- Coelostoma marshalli J.Balfour-Browne, 1950
- Coelostoma martensi Hebauer, 2002
- Coelostoma medianum Hebauer, 2002
- Coelostoma mixtum Mai et al., 2022
- Coelostoma mocquerysi Orchymont, 1936
- Coelostoma montanum Mouchamps, 1958
- Coelostoma mouchampsi M.Hansen, 1999
- Coelostoma nankunshanense Mai et al., 2022
- Coelostoma neavei J.Balfour-Browne, 1950
- Coelostoma nostocinum Sheth, Ghate & Fikáček, 2020
- Coelostoma oceanicum Mouchamps, 1958
- Coelostoma optatum J.Balfour-Browne, 1952
- Coelostoma orbiculare (Fabricius, 1775)
- Coelostoma orchymonti Mouchamps, 1958
- Coelostoma orientale Mouchamps, 1958
- Coelostoma parkeri Mouchamps, 1958
- Coelostoma phalacroides Régimbart, 1903
- Coelostoma phallicum Orchymont, 1940
- Coelostoma phototropicum Jia et al., 2019
- Coelostoma picturatum Orchymont, 1936
- Coelostoma protervum J.Balfour-Browne, 1959
- Coelostoma proximum Mouchamps, 1958
- Coelostoma pseudomartensi Mai et al., 2022
- Coelostoma punctulatum (Klug, 1833)
- Coelostoma remotum Mouchamps, 1958
- Coelostoma rhodesiense J.Balfour-Browne, 1950
- Coelostoma rhomphea Orchymont, 1936
- Coelostoma rohani Orchymont, 1931
- Coelostoma rubens Hebauer, 2002
- Coelostoma rubiginosum J.Balfour-Browne, 1950
- Coelostoma rufitarse (Boheman, 1851)
- Coelostoma rusticum Orchymont, 1936
- Coelostoma rutarum Orchymont, 1936
- Coelostoma salvazai Orchymont, 1919
- Coelostoma segne J.Balfour-Browne, 1952
- Coelostoma simulans Orchymont, 1925
- Coelostoma solitarium Mouchamps, 1958
- Coelostoma stultum (Walker, 1858)
- Coelostoma subditum Orchymont, 1936
- Coelostoma subsphaeroides (Régimbart, 1907)
- Coelostoma subtile Orchymont, 1936
- Coelostoma sulcatum Pu & Zhe-Long, 1963
- Coelostoma surkhetense Hebauer, 2002
- Coelostoma syriacum Orchymont, 1936
- Coelostoma taiwanense Liu et al., 2020
- Coelostoma tangliangi Jia et al., 2017
- Coelostoma thienemanni Orchymont, 1932
- Coelostoma tina Spangler & Steiner, 2003
- Coelostoma togoense Hebauer, 2003
- Coelostoma tortuosum J.Balfour-Browne, 1959
- Coelostoma transcaspicum Reitter, 1906
- Coelostoma trilobum G.Müller, 1942
- Coelostoma turnai Hebauer, 2006
- Coelostoma vagum Orchymont, 1940
- Coelostoma vitalisi Orchymont, 1923
- Coelostoma vividum Orchymont, 1936
- Coelostoma waterstradti Orchymont, 1936
- Coelostoma wittei J.Balfour-Browne, 1950
- Coelostoma wui Orchymont, 1940
- Coelostoma zumpti Orchymont, 1937
