= Phaenonotum exstriatum =

Scientific classification
- Domain: Eukaryota
- Kingdom: Animalia
- Phylum: Arthropoda
- Class: Insecta
- Order: Coleoptera
- Suborder: Polyphaga
- Infraorder: Staphyliniformia
- Family: Hydrophilidae
- Genus: Phaenonotum
- Species: P. exstriatum

Binomial name
- Phaenonotum exstriatum (Say, 1835)

Synonyms
- Phaenonotum dubium Sharp, 1882; Phaenonotum semiglobosum (Zimmermann, 1869)

Species of beetle

Phaenonotum exstriatum is a species of water scavenger beetle in the family Hydrophilidae. It is found in the Caribbean Sea, Central America, and North America. Their color typically ranges from dark brown to black.
