= Phaenonotum =

Scientific classification
- Kingdom: Animalia
- Phylum: Arthropoda
- Class: Insecta
- Order: Coleoptera
- Suborder: Polyphaga
- Infraorder: Staphyliniformia
- Family: Hydrophilidae
- Tribe: Coelostomatini
- Genus: Phaenonotum; Sharp, 1882

Genus of beetles

Phaenonotum is a genus of water scavenger beetles in the family Hydrophilidae. There are about nine described species in Phaenonotum.

== Species ==
These nine species belong to the genus Phaenonotum:

- Phaenonotum apicale Sharp, 1882
- Phaenonotum collare Sharp, 1882
- Phaenonotum delgadoi Deler-Hernández, Cala-Riquelme & Fikáček, 2013
- Phaenonotum exstriatum (Say, 1835)
- Phaenonotum globulosum (Mulsant, 1844)
- Phaenonotum meridionale d'Orchymont
- Phaenonotum minus Smetana, 1978
- Phaenonotum rotundulum Sharp, 1882
- Phaenonotum tarsale Sharp, 1882
