= Pelosoma =

Scientific classification
- Domain: Eukaryota
- Kingdom: Animalia
- Phylum: Arthropoda
- Class: Insecta
- Order: Coleoptera
- Suborder: Polyphaga
- Infraorder: Staphyliniformia
- Family: Hydrophilidae
- Tribe: Coelostomatini
- Genus: Pelosoma; Mulsant, 1844

Genus of beetles

Pelosoma is a genus of water scavenger beetles in the family Hydrophilidae. There are about seven described species in Pelosoma.

== Species ==
These seven species belong to the genus Pelosoma:

- Pelosoma lafertei Mulsant, 1844
- Pelosoma mesosternalum Hinton & Ancona, 1934
- Pelosoma orientale
- Pelosoma ovulum Sharp, 1887
- Pelosoma pecki Smetana, 1984
- Pelosoma prosternale Sharp, 1882
- Pelosoma rufipes (Fleutiaux & Sallé, 1889)
