= Coelostoma stultum =

Scientific classification
- Kingdom: Animalia
- Phylum: Arthropoda
- Class: Insecta
- Order: Coleoptera
- Suborder: Polyphaga
- Infraorder: Staphyliniformia
- Family: Hydrophilidae
- Genus: Coelostoma
- Species: C. stultum

Binomial name
- Coelostoma stultum (Walker, 1858)

Synonyms
- Hydrobius stultus Walker, 1858; Coelostoma sulcata Pu & Zhe-Long, 1963; Cyclonotum simplex Sharp, 1874

Species of beetle

Coelostoma stultum is a species of water scavenger beetle widely distributed in Palearctic and Oriental realms from West Pacific towards Indian Ocean, such as China, Taiwan, Andaman Islands, Myanmar, India, Indonesia, Japan, Korea, Malaysia, Mascarene Islands, Nicobar Islands, Oman, Philippines, Saudi Arabia, South Korea, Sri Lanka, Thailand, United Arab Emirates, and Vietnam.

== Description ==
Body length is about 4.2 to 5.8 mm. Body oval. Labrum blackish with yellow edges. Front margin of the labrum is emarginate. Elytral surface densely punctate. Prosternum moderately convex medially. Fifth abdominal ventrite is feebly emarginate posteromesally, not carinate. It bears a row of stout setae apically. Prosternum is not dentate. Head, pronotum and elytra consists with similar punctation. Median lobe of the aedeagus of male is almost parallel with broadly rounded apex. Aedeagus is shorter than parameres. Parameres are not sharply pointed whereas mesofemora without pubescence, and glabrous. Pronotum coarsely punctate and sparsely covered by short setae.

== Biology ==
The species has found commonly near the shore of paddy fields, ponds and rivers in Japan. Adult beetle has a breeding season once a year in early summer. Females build one egg cocoon enfolds several eggs after a single mating. It produces silk from the genitalia and then spins the lower part of the egg cocoon from it. Later, the female lays eggs and spins the lid of the egg cocoon to cover the eggs. Meanwhile, it has observed that female coats the lid with her feces for the protection against predators. During night time, the marsh slug, Deroceras laeve is known to prey on these eggs cocoons.
