= Pelosoma prosternale =

Scientific classification
- Kingdom: Animalia
- Phylum: Arthropoda
- Class: Insecta
- Order: Coleoptera
- Suborder: Polyphaga
- Infraorder: Staphyliniformia
- Family: Hydrophilidae
- Genus: Pelosoma
- Species: P. prosternale

Binomial name
- Pelosoma prosternale Sharp, 1882

Synonyms
- Pelosoma praecursor Smetana, 1978

Species of beetle

Pelosoma prosternale is a species of water scavenger beetle in the family Hydrophilidae. It is found in Central America and North America.
