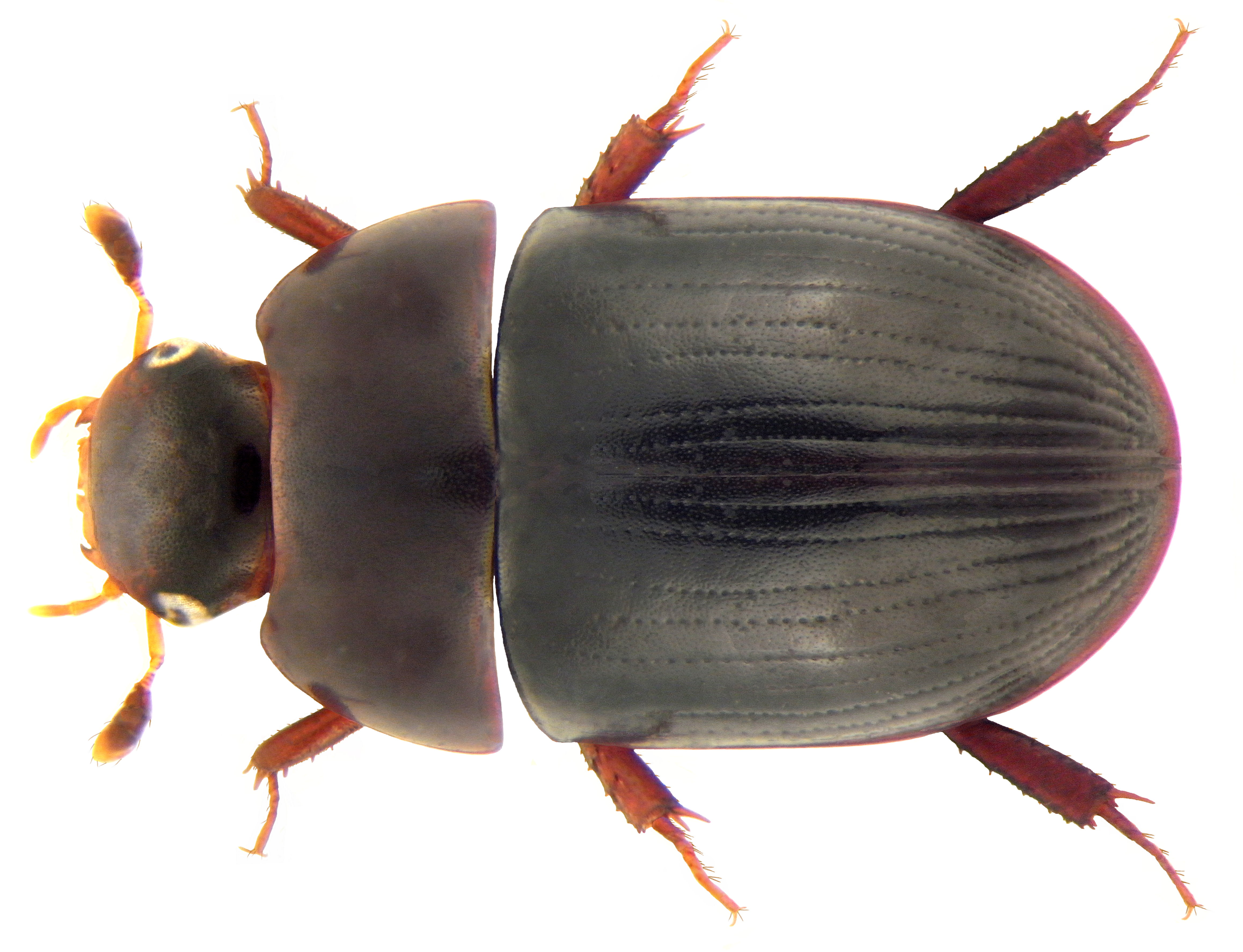
- Dactylosternum abdominale

Scientific classification
- Kingdom: Animalia
- Phylum: Arthropoda
- Clade: Pancrustacea
- Class: Insecta
- Order: Coleoptera
- Suborder: Polyphaga
- Infraorder: Staphyliniformia
- Family: Hydrophilidae
- Subfamily: Sphaeridiinae
- Tribe: Coelostomatini

= Coelostomatini =

Tribe of beetles

Coelostomatini is a tribe of water scavenger beetles in the family Hydrophilidae. There are about 7 genera and more than 70 described species in Coelostomatini.

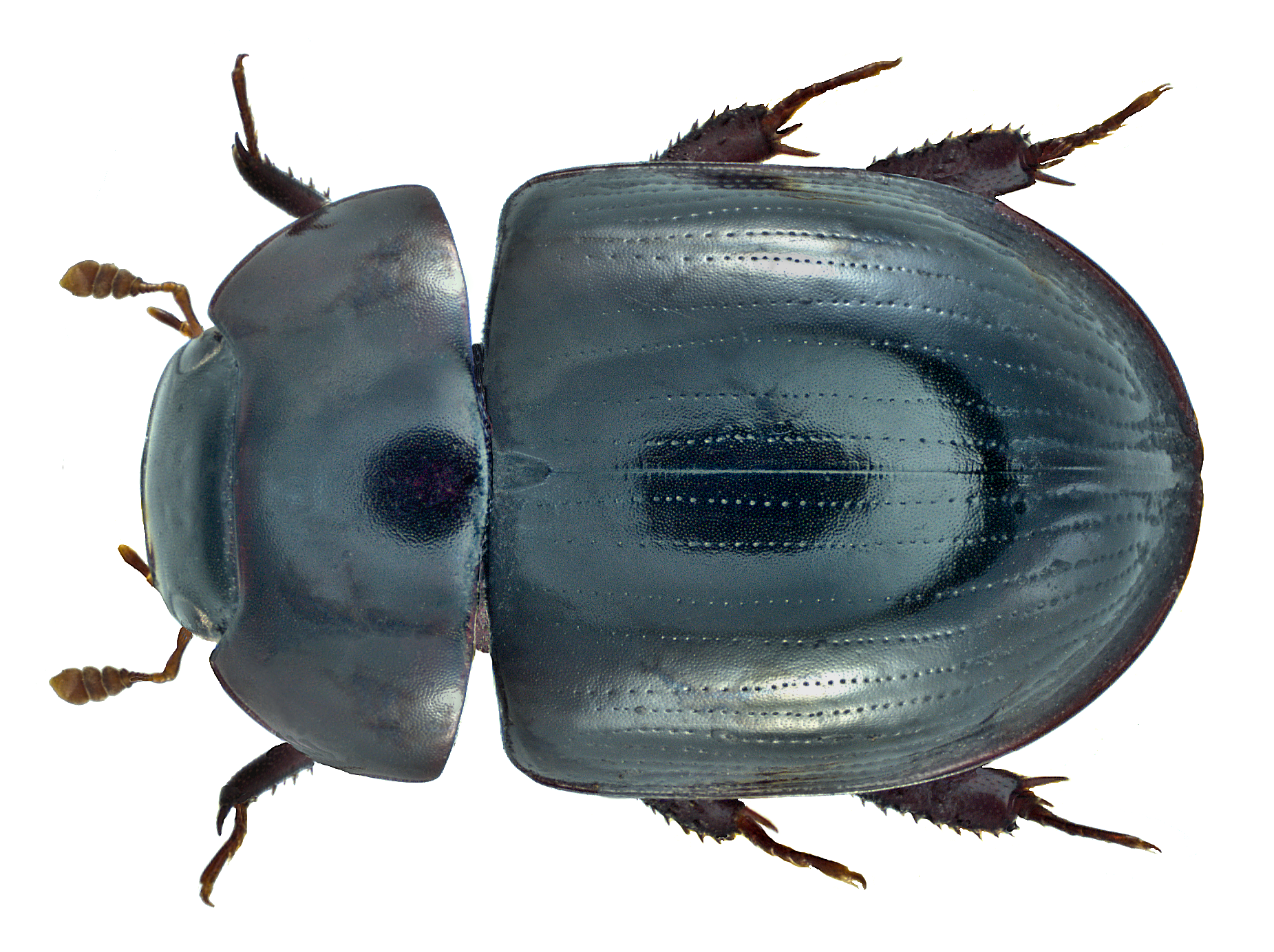
Dactylosternum hydrophiloides

== Genera ==
These seven genera belong to the tribe Coelostomatini:

- Coelofletium Orchymont, 1925
- Coelostoma Brullé, 1835
- Cyclotypus Sharp, 1882
- Dactylosternum Wollaston, 1854
- Pelosoma Mulsant, 1844
- Phaenonotum Sharp, 1882
- Phaenostoma Orchymont, 1937
