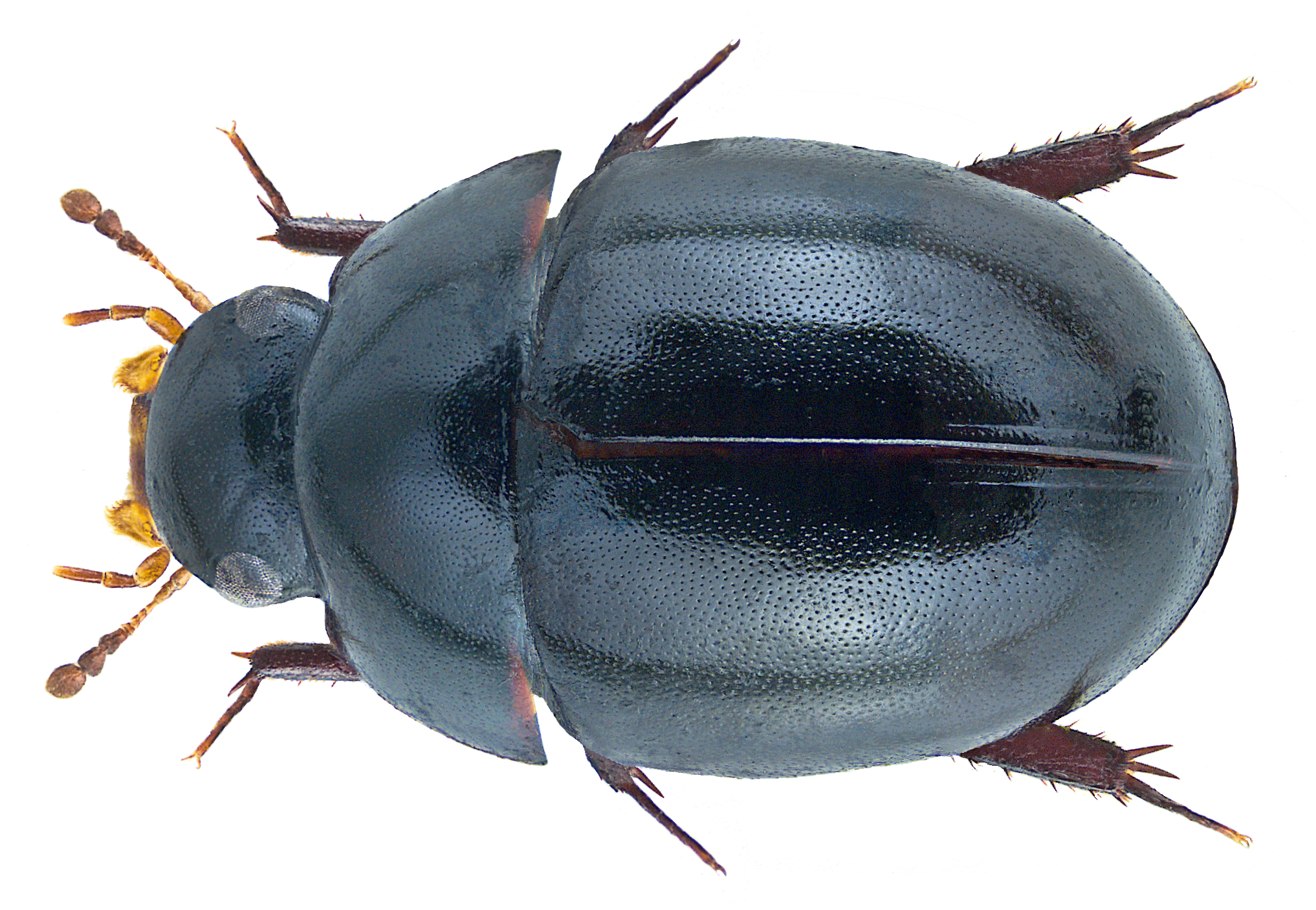

Scientific classification
- Kingdom: Animalia
- Phylum: Arthropoda
- Class: Insecta
- Order: Coleoptera
- Suborder: Polyphaga
- Infraorder: Staphyliniformia
- Family: Hydrophilidae
- Genus: Coelostoma
- Species: C. vitalisi

Binomial name
- Coelostoma vitalisi D`Orchymont, 1923

= Coelostoma vitalisi =

Species of beetle

Coelostoma vitalisi is a species of water scavenger beetle found in China, Taiwan, Japan, India, Indonesia, Japan, Malaysia, Nepal, Singapore, Sri Lanka, Cambodia, Thailand and Vietnam.

== Description ==
Body length is about 4.1 to 4.7 mm. Body oval, and strongly convex. Dorsum blackish whereas labrum black with yellow edges. Elytral surface densely punctate, and sutural stria reaching basal half of elytra. Mesofemora consist with sparse strong setae. Abdominal ventrite V without stout setae. In male, aedeagus has widely angulate apex, large and wide gonopore and parameres bent inwards, with a tuft of setae at the apex. There is a very wide median lobe with a very large subapical gonopore in aedeagus.
