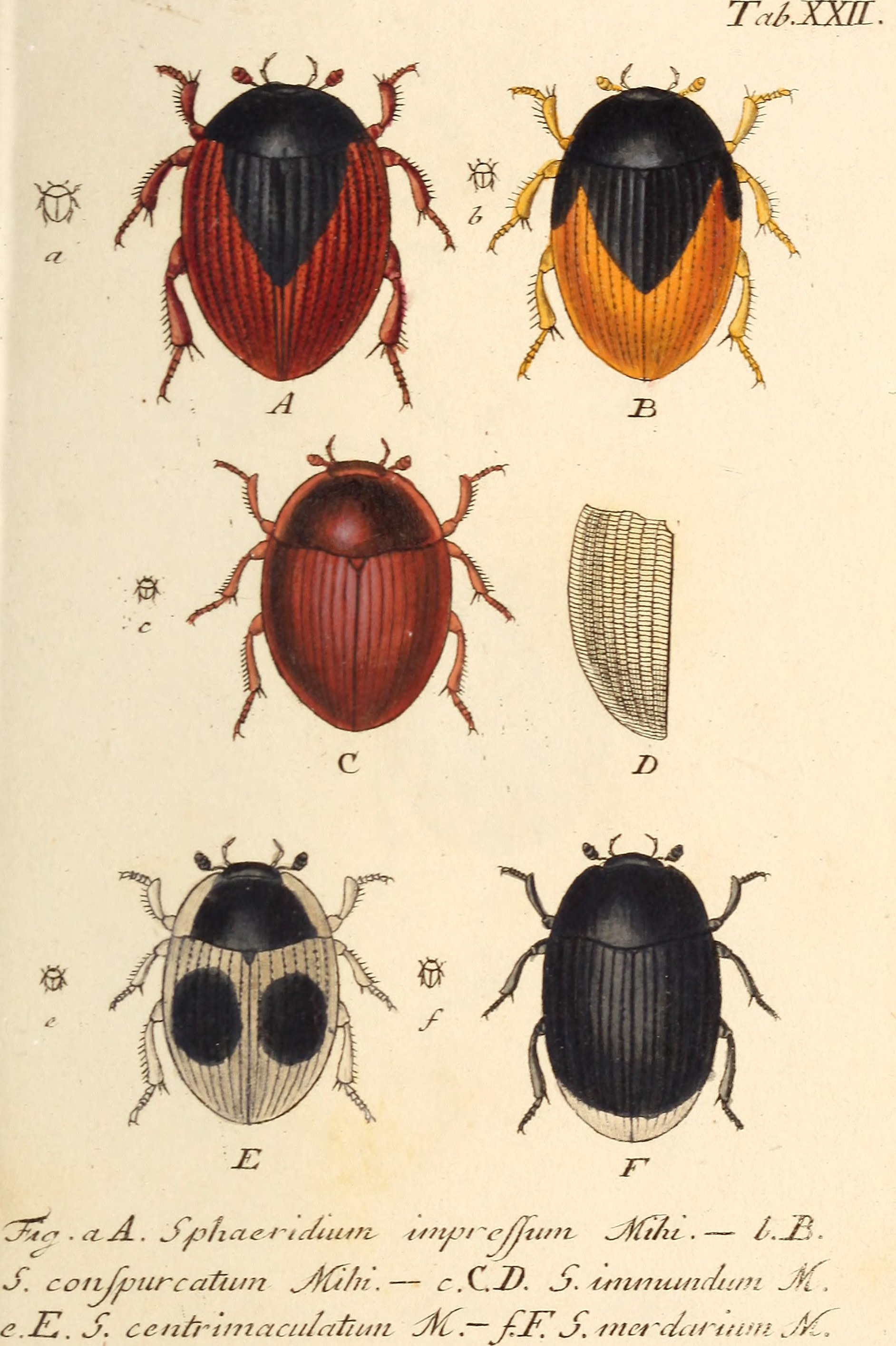
- Illustration page of Deutschlands insecten (1805) with Sphaeridium impressum, Sphaeridium conspurcatum, Sphaeridium immundum, Sphaeridium centrimaculatum and Sphaeridium merdarium

Scientific classification
- Kingdom: Animalia
- Phylum: Arthropoda
- Clade: Pancrustacea
- Class: Insecta
- Order: Coleoptera
- Suborder: Polyphaga
- Infraorder: Staphyliniformia
- Family: Hydrophilidae
- Subfamily: Sphaeridiinae; Latreille, 1802

Tribes
- Coelostomatini; Megasternini; Omicrini; Protosternini; Sphaeridiini

= Sphaeridiinae =

Subfamily of beetles

Sphaeridiinae is a subfamily of water scavenger beetles (insects in the family Hydrophilidae). Some species live in fresh water as both larvae and adults.

== Habitat ==
Sphaeridiinae is a subfamily of Hydrophilidae that is considered mostly terrestrial compared to the other aquatic subfamilies in the larger overarching family of Hydrophilidae. There have been some instances of this subfamily living in riparian habitats or floating vegetation, however, this subfamily is not constrained to aquatic ecosystems. In general, Hydrophilidae species have larvae that are aquatic or terrestrial and the adults are mainly aquatic. In Sphaeridiinae's case, there has been a trend for it to colonize on solely moist terrestrial land, including places of decomposition.

== Reproductive behavior ==
The larvae stages of this subfamily also develop in moist areas like dung, decomposing fungi and plant material and moist soil. The adults also came back to fresh manure to lay their eggs. In addition, Sphaeridiinae tend to lay fewer eggs than the whole family Hydrophilidae due to its habitat and the cannibalistic nature of the larvae.
