= List of water beetle species recorded in Great Britain =

== Suborder Adephaga ==
Note: the family Carabidae (ground beetles), is also part of this suborder; a list of these is at List of ground beetle (Carabidae) species recorded in Britain.

=== Family Gyrinidae ===
- Gyrinus aeratus
- Gyrinus caspius
- Gyrinus distinctuss
- Gyrinus marinus
- Gyrinus minutus
- Gyrinus natator
- Gyrinus opacus
- Gyrinus paykulli
- Gyrinus substriatus
- Gyrinus suffriani
- Gyrinus urinator
- Orectochilus villosus — hairy whirligig beetle

=== Family Haliplidae ===
- Brychius elevatus
- Peltodytes caesus
- Haliplus confinis
- Haliplus obliquus
- Haliplus varius
- Haliplus lineatocollis
- Haliplus apicalis
- Haliplus fluviatilis
- Haliplus furcatus
- Haliplus heydeni
- Haliplus immaculatus
- Haliplus lineolatus
- Haliplus ruficollis
- Haliplus sibiricus
- Haliplus flavicollis
- Haliplus fulvus
- Haliplus laminatus
- Haliplus mucronatus
- Haliplus variegatus

=== Family Noteridae ===
- Noterus clavicornis
- Noterus crassicornis

=== Family Paelobiidae ===
- Hygrobia hermanni

=== Family Dytiscidae ===
- Agabus arcticus
- Agabus congener
- Agabus sturmii
- Agabus labiatus
- Agabus uliginosus
- Agabus undulatus
- Agabus affinis
- Agabus biguttatus
- Agabus bipustulatus
- Agabus brunneus
- Agabus conspersus
- Agabus didymus
- Agabus guttatus
- Agabus melanarius
- Agabus nebulosus
- Agabus paludosus
- Agabus striolatus
- Agabus unguicularis
- Ilybius aenescens
- Ilybius ater
- Ilybius chalconatus
- Ilybius fenestratus
- Ilybius fuliginosus
- Ilybius guttiger
- Ilybius montanus
- Ilybius quadriguttatus
- Ilybius subaeneus
- Ilybius wasastjernae
- Platambus maculatus
- Colymbetes fuscus
- Rhantus grapii
- Rhantus bistriatus
- Rhantus exsoletus
- Rhantus frontalis
- Rhantus suturalis
- Rhantus suturellus
- Liopterus haemorrhoidalis
- Acilius canaliculatus
- Acilius sulcatus
- Graphoderus bilineatus
- Graphoderus cinereus
- Graphoderus zonatus
- Cybister lateralimarginalis
- Dytiscus circumcinctus
- Dytiscus circumflexus
- Dytiscus dimidiatus
- Dytiscus lapponicus
- Dytiscus marginalis - great diving beetle
- Dytiscus semisulcatus
- Hydaticus continentalis
- Hydaticus seminiger
- Hydaticus transversalis
- Bidessus minutissimus
- Bidessus unistriatus
- Hydroglyphus geminus
- Deronectes latus
- Graptodytes bilineatus
- Graptodytes flavipes
- Graptodytes granularis
- Graptodytes pictus
- Hydroporus angustatus
- Hydroporus discretus
- Hydroporus elongatulus
- Hydroporus erythrocephalus
- Hydroporus ferrugineus
- Hydroporus glabriusculus
- Hydroporus gyllenhalii
- Hydroporus incognitus
- Hydroporus longicornis
- Hydroporus longulus
- Hydroporus marginatus
- Hydroporus melanarius
- Hydroporus memnonius
- Hydroporus morio
- Hydroporus necopinatus
- Hydroporus neglectus
- Hydroporus nigrita
- Hydroporus obscurus
- Hydroporus obsoletus
- Hydroporus palustris
- Hydroporus planus
- Hydroporus pubescens
- Hydroporus rufifrons
- Hydroporus scalesianus
- Hydroporus striola
- Hydroporus tessellatus
- Hydroporus tristis
- Hydroporus umbrosus
- Nebrioporus assimilis
- Nebrioporus depressus
- Nebrioporus elegans
- Nebrioporus canaliculatus
- Oreodytes alpinus
- Oreodytes davisii
- Oreodytes sanmarkii
- Oreodytes septentrionalis
- Porhydrus lineatus
- Scarodytes halensis
- Stictonectes lepidus
- Stictotarsus duodecimpustulatus
- Stictotarsus multilineatus
- Suphrodytes dorsalis
- Hydrovatus clypealis
- Hygrotus confluens
- Hygrotus impressopunctatus
- Hygrotus nigrolineatus
- Hygrotus novemlineatus
- Hygrotus parallelogrammus
- Hygrotus decoratus
- Hygrotus inaequalis
- Hygrotus quinquelineatus
- Hygrotus versicolor
- Hyphydrus ovatus
- Laccornis oblongus
- Laccophilus hyalinus
- Laccophilus minutus
- Laccophilus poecilus

== Suborder Polyphaga ==
=== Infraorder Elateriformia ===
==== Superfamily Byrrhoidea ====
===== Family Elmidae =====
- Elmis aenea
- Esolus parallelepipedus
- Limnius volckmari
- Macronychus quadrituberculatus
- Normandia nitens
- Oulimnius major
- Oulimnius rivularis
- Oulimnius troglodytes
- Oulimnius tuberculatus
- Riolus cupreus
- Riolus subviolaceus
- Stenelmis canaliculata

===== Family Dryopidae =====
- Pomatinus substriatus
- Dryops anglicanus
- Dryops auriculatus
- Dryops ernesti
- Dryops griseus
- Dryops luridus
- Dryops similaris
- Dryops striatellus
- Dryops nitidulus

===== Family Limnichidae =====
- Limnichus pygmaeus

=== Infraorder Staphyliniformia ===
==== Superfamily Hydrophiloidea ====
===== Family Helophoridae =====
- Helophorus nubilus
- Helophorus porculus
- Helophorus rufipes
- Helophorus tuberculatus
- Helophorus alternans
- Helophorus aequalis
- Helophorus grandis
- Helophorus arvernicus
- Helophorus brevipalpis
- Helophorus dorsalis
- Helophorus flavipes
- Helophorus fulgidicollis
- Helophorus granularis
- Helophorus griseus
- Helophorus laticollis
- Helophorus longitarsis
- Helophorus minutus
- Helophorus nanus
- Helophorus obscurus
- Helophorus strigifrons

===== Family Georissidae =====
- Georissus crenulatus

===== Family Hydrochidae =====
- Hydrochus angustatus
- Hydrochus brevis
- Hydrochus crenatus
- Hydrochus elongatus
- Hydrochus ignicollis
- Hydrochus megaphallus
- Hydrochus nitidicollis

===== Family Spercheidae =====
- Spercheus emarginatus

===== Family Hydrophilidae =====
- Anacaena bipustulata
- Anacaena globulus
- Anacaena limbata
- Anacaena lutescens
- Paracymus aeneus
- Paracymus scutellaris
- Berosus affinis
- Berosus luridus
- Berosus signaticollis
- Berosus fulvus
- Chaetarthria seminulum
- Chaetarthria simillima
- Cymbiodyta marginellus
- Enochrus affinis
- Enochrus bicolor
- Enochrus coarctatus
- Enochrus fuscipennis
- Enochrus halophilus
- Enochrus melanocephalus
- Enochrus nigritus
- Enochrus ochropterus
- Enochrus quadripunctatus
- Enochrus testaceus
- Helochares lividus
- Helochares obscurus
- Helochares punctatus
- Hydrobius fuscipes
- Limnoxenus niger
- Hydrochara caraboides - lesser silver water beetle
- Hydrophilus piceus - great silver water beetle
- Laccobius atratus
- Laccobius bipunctatus
- Laccobius colon
- Laccobius minutus
- Laccobius obscuratus
- Laccobius simulatrix
- Laccobius sinuatus
- Laccobius striatulus
- Laccobius ytenensis
- Coelostoma orbiculare
- Dactylosternum abdominale
- Cercyon alpinus
- Cercyon bifenestratus
- Cercyon convexiusculus
- Cercyon depressus
- Cercyon granarius
- Cercyon haemorrhoidalis
- Cercyon impressus
- Cercyon laminatus
- Cercyon lateralis
- Cercyon littoralis
- Cercyon marinus
- Cercyon melanocephalus
- Cercyon nigriceps
- Cercyon obsoletus
- Cercyon pygmaeus
- Cercyon quisquilius
- Cercyon sternalis
- Cercyon terminatus
- Cercyon tristis
- Cercyon unipunctatus
- Cercyon analis
- Cercyon ustulatus
- Megasternum concinnum
- Cryptopleurum crenatum
- Cryptopleurum minutum
- Cryptopleurum subtile
- Sphaeridium bipustulatum
- Sphaeridium lunatum
- Sphaeridium marginatum
- Sphaeridium scarabaeoides

==== Superfamily Staphylinoidea ====
===== Family Hydraenidae =====
- Hydraena britteni
- Hydraena flavipes
- Hydraena gracilis
- Hydraena nigrita
- Hydraena palustris
- Hydraena pulchella
- Hydraena pygmaea
- Hydraena riparia
- Hydraena rufipes
- Hydraena testacea
- Limnebius aluta
- Limnebius crinifer
- Limnebius nitidus
- Limnebius papposus
- Limnebius truncatellus
- Enicocerus exsculptus
- Ochthebius auriculatus
- Ochthebius bicolon
- Ochthebius dilatatus
- Ochthebius aeneus
- Ochthebius lejolisii
- Ochthebius minimus
- Ochthebius difficilis
- Ochthebius nanus
- Ochthebius poweri
- Ochthebius punctatus
- Ochthebius lenensis
- Ochthebius marinus
- Ochthebius pusillus
- Ochthebius viridis
- Aulacochthebius exaratus
