= A. anthracinus =

A. anthracinus may refer to:

- Abacetus anthracinus, a ground beetle
- Agabus anthracinus, a predaceous diving beetle found in North America
- Anisodactylus anthracinus, a ground beetle found in North America
- Anoplodesmus anthracinus, a millipede found in Myanmar, Malaysia, and Sri Lanka
