= Agabus aeruginosus =

Scientific classification
- Domain: Eukaryota
- Kingdom: Animalia
- Phylum: Arthropoda
- Class: Insecta
- Order: Coleoptera
- Suborder: Adephaga
- Family: Dytiscidae
- Genus: Agabus
- Subgenus: Agabus
- Species: A. aeruginosus

Binomial name
- Agabus aeruginosus Aubé, 1838

Species of beetle

Agabus aeruginosus is a species of predatory diving beetle belonging to the family Dytiscidae. It is found in the United States. Its habitats include small vernal ponds.
