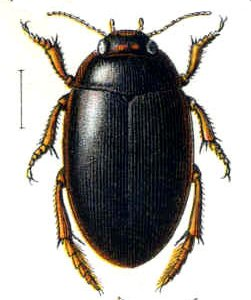
- A. uliginosus

Scientific classification
- Domain: Eukaryota
- Kingdom: Animalia
- Phylum: Arthropoda
- Class: Insecta
- Order: Coleoptera
- Suborder: Adephaga
- Family: Dytiscidae
- Tribe: Agabini
- Genus: Agabus; Leach, 1817

= Agabus (beetle) =

Genus of beetles

Agabus is a large genus of predatory aquatic beetles in the family Dytiscidae, proposed in 1817 by William Elford Leach and named after Agabus, an early follower of Christianity. The adult beetles are moderate-sized, 5 to 14 mm long. The genus is primarily Holarctic in distribution, with only a few species known from the Afrotropical and Neotropical realms. Three species of Agabus, namely A. clypealis, A. discicollis and A. hozgargantae are endangered according to the IUCN Red List. The division into subgenera is not widely accepted. However, a number of species groups are recognized after the works of David J. Larson and Anders N. Nilsson. The genus is probably polyphyletic or paraphyletic. In a recent study of mitochondrial DNA, Agabus was found paraphyletic with respect to several of the species groups of Platambus, a closely related genus in the tribe Agabini. Lately the taxonomy of the genus has been revised, and some groups of species were transferred from Agabus sensu stricto to other genera in the tribe Agabini.

Agabus contains the following species:

- Agabus abessinicus (Zimmermann, 1928)
- Agabus adpressus Aubé, 1837
- Agabus adustus Guignot, 1954
- Agabus aequabilis (Gschwendtner, 1923)
- Agabus aequalis Sharp, 1882
- Agabus aeruginosus Aubé, 1838
- Agabus affinis (Paykull, 1798)
- Agabus africanus Pederzani & Schizzerotto, 1998
- Agabus ajax Fall, 1922
- Agabus alexandrae Ribera, Hernando & Aguilera, 2001
- Agabus alinae (Lafer, 1988)
- Agabus ambiguus (Say, 1823)
- Agabus ambulator Régimbart, 1895
- Agabus amnicola (J.Sahlberg, 1880)
- Agabus amoenus Solsky, 1874
- Agabus ancillus Fall, 1922
- Agabus angusi Nilsson, 1994
- Agabus antennatus Leech, 1939
- Agabus anthracinus Mannerheim, 1852
- Agabus approximatus Fall, 1922
- Agabus arcticus (Paykull, 1798)
- Agabus aubei Perris, 1869
- Agabus audeni Wallis, 1933
- Agabus austinii Sharp, 1882
- Agabus bakeri (Zimmermann, 1924)
- Agabus basalis (Gebler, 1829)
- Agabus bergi Zaitzev, 1913
- Agabus bicolor (Kirby, 1837)
- Agabus bifarius (Kirby, 1837)
- Agabus biguttatus (Olivier, 1795)
- Agabus biguttulus (Thomson, 1867)
- Agabus binotatus Aubé, 1837
- Agabus bipustulatus (Linnaeus, 1767)
- Agabus blatta Jakovlev, 1897
- Agabus brandti Harold, 1880
- Agabus browni Kamiya, 1934
- Agabus brunneus (Fabricius, 1798)
- Agabus canadensis Fall, 1922
- Agabus caraboides Sharp, 1882
- Agabus cephalotes Reiche, 1861
- Agabus charon Wickham, 1912
- Agabus clavicornis Sharp, 1882
- Agabus clypealis (Thomson, 1867)
- Agabus colymbus Leech, 1938
- Agabus confinis (Gyllenhal, 1808)
- Agabus congener (Thunberg, 1794)
- Agabus congeneroides Lomnicki, 1894
- Agabus conspersus (Marsham, 1802)
- Agabus conspicuus Sharp, 1873
- Agabus corticeus Lomnicki, 1894
- Agabus costulatus (Motschulsky, 1859)
- Agabus coxalis Sharp, 1882
- Agabus crassipes (Fall, 1922)
- Agabus crypticoides Régimbart, 1895
- Agabus debilipes Régimbart, 1899
- Agabus dichrous Sharp, 1878
- Agabus didymus (Olivier, 1795)
- Agabus dilatatus (Brullé, 1832)
- Agabus discolor (Harris, 1828)
- Agabus disintegratus (Crotch, 1873)
- Agabus dytiscoides Régimbart, 1908
- Agabus elongatus (Gyllenhal, 1826)
- Agabus erytropterus (Say, 1823)
- Agabus faldermanni Zaitzev, 1927
- Agabus falli (Zimmermann, 1934)
- Agabus freudei Guéorguiev, 1975
- Agabus friedrichi (Falkenström, 1936)
- Agabus fulvaster Zaitzev, 1906
- Agabus fulvipennis Régimbart, 1899
- Agabus fuscipennis (Paykull, 1798)
- Agabus galamensis Nilsson, 1992
- Agabus glacialis Hochhuth, 1846
- Agabus glazunovi (Zaitzev, 1953)
- Agabus godmanni Crotch, 1867
- Agabus granulatus (Falkenström, 1936)
- Agabus gringo Larson, 2000
- Agabus griseipennis LeConte, 1859
- Agabus guttatus (Paykull, 1798)
- Agabus heydeni Wehncke, 1872
- Agabus hoppingi Leech, 1942
- Agabus hummeli (Falkenström, 1936)
- Agabus immaturus Larson, 1991
- Agabus inexspectatus Nilsson, 1990
- Agabus infuscatus Aubé, 1838
- Agabus inscriptus (Crotch, 1873)
- Agabus jacobsoni Zaitzev, 1905
- Agabus japonicus Sharp, 1873
- Agabus kaszabi Guéorguiev, 1972
- Agabus kholini Nilsson, 1994
- Agabus klamathensis Larson & Leech, 1989
- Agabus kokoosson Feng, 1936
- Agabus kootenai Larson, 1991
- Agabus labiatus (Brahm, 1790)
- Agabus laferi Nilsson, 1994
- Agabus lagabrunensis Schizzerotto & Fery, 1989
- Agabus lapponicus (Thomson, 1867)
- Agabus leptapsis (LeConte, 1878)
- Agabus lineatus Gebler, 1848
- Agabus lithax Riha, 1961
- Agabus lobonyx Guignot, 1952
- Agabus loeffleri Wewalka & Nilsson, 1990
- Agabus longissimus Régimbart, 1899
- Agabus luteaster Zaitzev, 1906
- Agabus lutosus LeConte, 1853
- Agabus mackenziensis Larson, 1991
- Agabus maderensis Wollaston, 1854
- Agabus mandsuricus (Guignot, 1956)
- Agabus margaretae Larson, 1975
- Agabus matsumotoi Satô & Nilsson, 1990
- Agabus melanarius Aubé, 1837
- Agabus moestus (Curtis, 1835)
- Agabus morosus LeConte, 1852
- Agabus mucronatus (Falkenström, 1936)
- Agabus nebulosus (Forster, 1771)
- Agabus nevadensis Hå.Lindberg, 1939
- Agabus niedzwiedzkii Lomnicki, 1894
- Agabus obliteratus LeConte, 1859
- Agabus oblongulus Fall, 1922
- Agabus obsoletus LeConte, 1858
- Agabus ommani Zaitzev, 1908
- Agabus pallens Poppius, 1905
- Agabus pallidus Omer-Cooper, 1931
- Agabus paludosus (Fabricius, 1801)
- Agabus parvulus Lomnicki, 1894
- Agabus perditus Scudder, 1900
- Agabus perssoni Nilsson, 1992
- Agabus phaeopterus (Kirby, 1837)
- Agabus philippensis (Zimmermann, 1924)
- Agabus picotae Foster & Bilton, 1997
- Agabus pisobius Leech, 1949
- Agabus poppiusi Nilsson, 2003
- Agabus pseudoclypealis Scholz, 1933
- Agabus punctatus F.E.Melsheimer, 1844
- Agabus punctulatus Aubé, 1838
- Agabus raffrayi Sharp, 1882
- Agabus ragazzii Régimbart, 1887
- Agabus ramblae Millán & Ribera, 2001
- Agabus rathbuni Scudder, 1900
- Agabus regimbarti Zaitzev, 1906
- Agabus reitteri Lomnicki, 1894
- Agabus rottensis Nilsson, 2001
- Agabus rufipennis (Gschwendtner, 1933)
- Agabus rufulus Fairmaire, 1859
- Agabus rumppi Leech, 1964
- Agabus ruwenzoricus Guignot, 1936
- Agabus safei Abdul-Karim & Ali, 1986
- Agabus sasquatch Larson, 1991
- Agabus semipunctatus (Kirby, 1837)
- Agabus serricornis (Paykull, 1799)
- Agabus setulosus (J.Sahlberg, 1895)
- Agabus sikhotealinensis (Lafer, 1988)
- Agabus sjostedti Régimbart, 1908
- Agabus slovzovi (J.Sahlberg, 1880)
- Agabus smithi Brown, 1930
- Agabus solskii Jakovlev, 1897
- Agabus strigulosus (Crotch, 1873)
- Agabus striolatus (Gyllenhal, 1808)
- Agabus sturmii (Gyllenhal, 1808)
- Agabus subfuscatus Sharp, 1882
- Agabus suoduogangi Stastný & Nilsson, 2003
- Agabus svenhedini (Falkenström, 1932)
- Agabus taeniolatus (Harris, 1828)
- Agabus taiwanensis Nilsson & Wewalka, 1994
- Agabus thomsoni (J.Sahlberg, 1871)
- Agabus tibetanus Zaitzev, 1908
- Agabus tristis Aubé, 1838
- Agabus turcmenus Guignot, 1957
- Agabus udege Nilsson, 1994
- Agabus uliginosus (Linnaeus, 1761)
- Agabus undulatus (Schrank, 1776)
- Agabus ungeri (Heer, 1847)
- Agabus unguicularis (Thomson, 1867)
- Agabus uralensis Nilsson & Petrov, 2006
- Agabus valdiviensis Gemminger & Harold, 1868
- Agabus velox Leech, 1939
- Agabus vereschaginae Angus, 1984
- Agabus winkleri (Gschwendtner, 1923)
- Agabus wollastoni Sharp, 1882
- Agabus xyztrus Larson, 2000
- Agabus yakutiae Nilsson & Larson, 1990
- Agabus zetterstedti Thomson, 1856
- Agabus zimmermanni Scholz, 1920
