= Agabus adpressus =

Scientific classification
- Domain: Eukaryota
- Kingdom: Animalia
- Phylum: Arthropoda
- Class: Insecta
- Order: Coleoptera
- Suborder: Adephaga
- Family: Dytiscidae
- Genus: Agabus
- Subgenus: Gaurodytes
- Species: A. adpressus

Binomial name
- Agabus adpressus Aubé, 1837

Synonyms
- Agabus solus Leech, 1949

Species of beetle

Agabus adpressus is a species of beetle belonging to the family Dytiscidae. In North America this species has been found in Alaska, the Northwest Territories, and Southampton Island. It also ranges from northern Scandinavia to eastern Siberia and Mongolia. This species lives in running water or lake shores. It can usually be found under stones near the water's edge, but sometimes inhabits sedge roots or overhanging vegetation on undercut river banks.
