= Agabus aequabilis =

Scientific classification
- Kingdom: Animalia
- Phylum: Arthropoda
- Class: Insecta
- Order: Coleoptera
- Suborder: Adephaga
- Family: Dytiscidae
- Genus: Agabus
- Subgenus: Gaurodytes
- Species: A. aequabilis

Binomial name
- Agabus aequabilis (Gschwendtner, 1923)

Species of beetle

Agabus aequabilis is a species of predatory diving beetle belonging to the family Dytiscidae. This species is found in Central Asia, with records from Xinjiang and Uzbekistan. It is closely related to Agabus aequalis, and may in fact be the same species, though not enough information is currently available to make this distinction.
