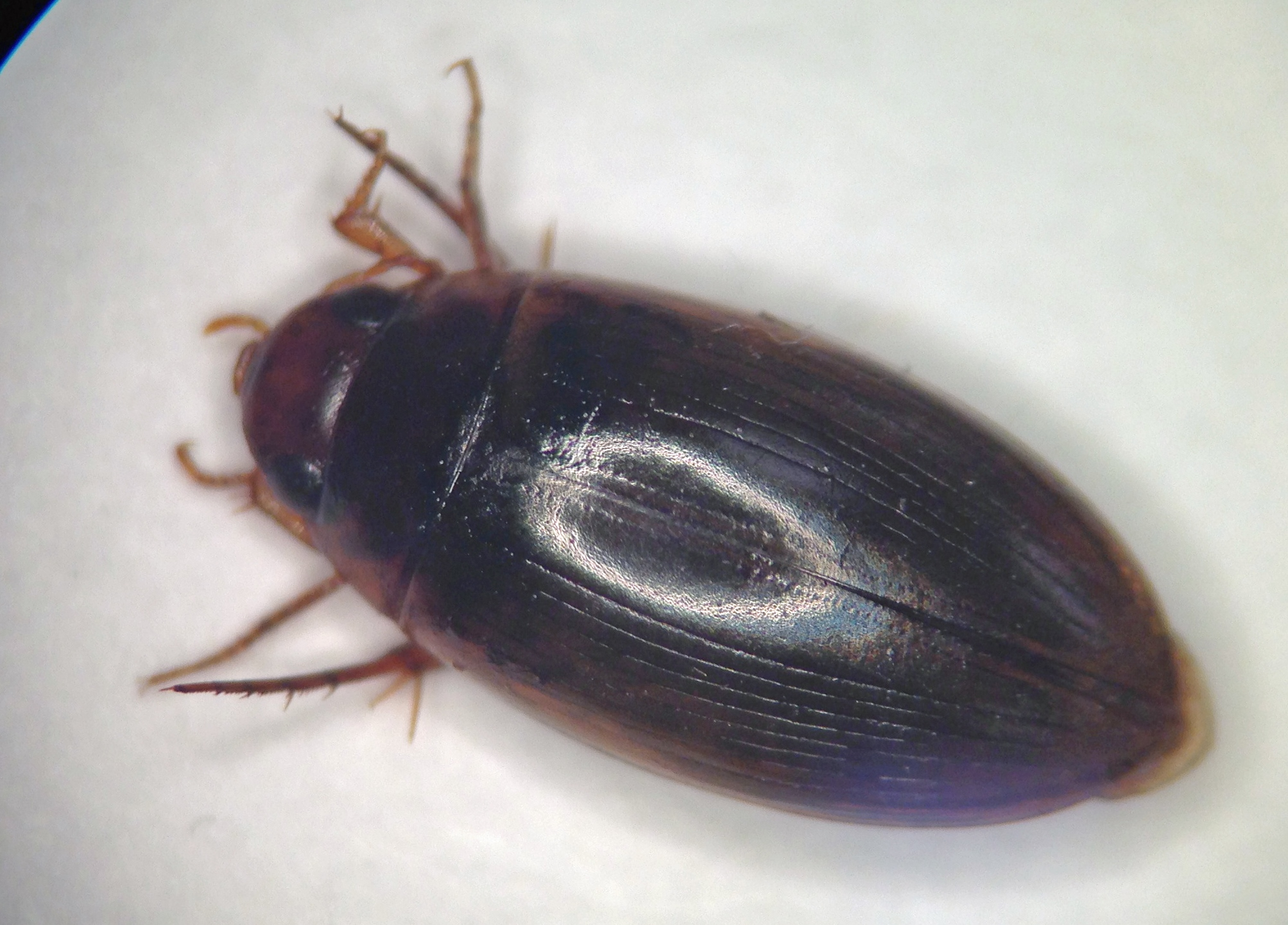

Scientific classification
- Domain: Eukaryota
- Kingdom: Animalia
- Phylum: Arthropoda
- Class: Insecta
- Order: Coleoptera
- Suborder: Adephaga
- Family: Dytiscidae
- Genus: Copelatus
- Species: C. chevrolati

Binomial name
- Copelatus chevrolati Aubé, 1838

= Copelatus chevrolati =

Species of beetle

Copelatus chevrolati is a species of diving beetle. It is part of the genus Copelatus in the subfamily Copelatinae of the family Dytiscidae. It was described by Aubé in 1838. There are two described subspecies: C. c. chevrolati and C. c. renovatus.

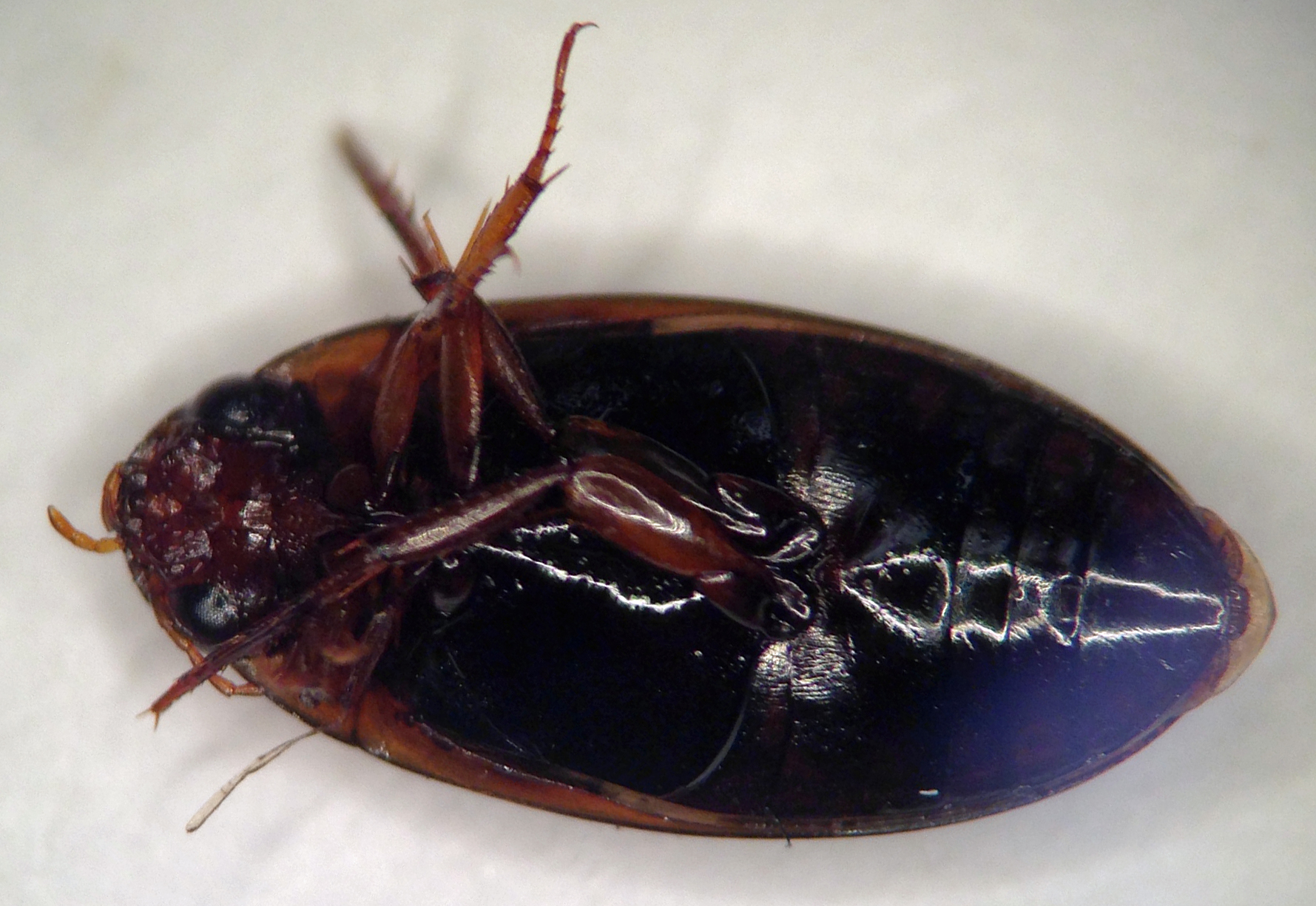
Ventral view

== Distribution ==
Copelatus chevrolati ranges across the southern and central United States from North Carolina west to California and Texas and Florida north to South Dakota and Michigan, with records from southern Ontario. Copelatus chevrolati renovatus is the western subspecies, whereas C. c. chevrolati is the eastern subspecies.

== Description ==
Adults range in length from 5.3 to 6.7 millimetres (0.21 to 0.26 in) and width from 2.6 to 3.1 millimetres (0.10 to 0.12 in) and range in color from pale reddish brown to a darker reddish brown. They are distinguished from other North American Copelatus species by having 8 or 9 discal striae.
