= Agabus abessinicus =

Scientific classification
- Kingdom: Animalia
- Phylum: Arthropoda
- Class: Insecta
- Order: Coleoptera
- Suborder: Adephaga
- Family: Dytiscidae
- Genus: Agabus
- Subgenus: Gaurodytes
- Species: A. abessinicus

Binomial name
- Agabus abessinicus (Zimmermann, 1928)

Species of beetle

Agabus abessinicus is a species of beetle belonging to the family Dytiscidae. It is found in Ethiopia.
