= Oreodytes congruus =

Scientific classification
- Kingdom: Animalia
- Phylum: Arthropoda
- Class: Insecta
- Order: Coleoptera
- Suborder: Adephaga
- Family: Dytiscidae
- Genus: Oreodytes
- Species: O. congruus

Binomial name
- Oreodytes congruus (LeConte, 1878)

Species of beetle

Oreodytes congruus is a species of predaceous diving beetle in the family Dytiscidae. It is found in North America.
