= Agabus ramblae =

Scientific classification
- Kingdom: Animalia
- Phylum: Arthropoda
- Clade: Pancrustacea
- Class: Insecta
- Order: Coleoptera
- Suborder: Adephaga
- Family: Dytiscidae
- Genus: Agabus
- Subgenus: Gaurodytes
- Species: A. ramblae

Binomial name
- Agabus ramblae Millán & Ribera, 2001

Species of beetle

Agabus ramblae is a species of beetles belonging to the family Dytiscidae. It is found in Spain and North Africa.

== Etymology ==
Agabus ramblae is named for the small, often temporary streams in the south eastern Iberian Peninsula which it typically inhabits, known as "ramblas" in Murcia.

== Description ==
Agabus ramblae can reach a length of 6.3–8 millimetres (0.25–0.31 inches) and a width of 3.8–4.8 millimetres (0.15–0.19 inches). The head is rusty dark red. The back is reddish brown, while the underside is black with reddish brown base of pronotum. Elytrae have irregular rows of punctures. It possesses well developed, membranous wings.

=== Life cycle and reproduction ===
Agabus ramblae has 43 chromosomal pairs, and has an X0 sex-determination system. It appears to breed in spring or summer, spending winter as an adult.

== Distribution and habitat ==
This species is widely distributed throughout the eastern Iberian peninsula, as well as the Balearic Islands. It is also present in Libya and Tunisia. The small streams and rivers in which it is typically found tend to be mineralized, with silt or clay substrate, and sparse riparian vegetation. It prefers shallow, slow moving, clean, well oxygenated water. It can occasionally be found in eutrophic waters.
