= Oreodytes laevis =

Scientific classification
- Domain: Eukaryota
- Kingdom: Animalia
- Phylum: Arthropoda
- Class: Insecta
- Order: Coleoptera
- Suborder: Adephaga
- Family: Dytiscidae
- Genus: Oreodytes
- Species: O. laevis

Binomial name
- Oreodytes laevis (Kirby, 1837)

Synonyms
- Hydroporus hortense Hatch, 1933; Hydroporus laevis Kirby, 1837; Hydroporus semiclarus Fall, 1923; Hydroporus yukonensis Fall, 1926; Oreodytes semiclarus (Fall, 1923)

Species of beetle

Oreodytes laevis is a species of predaceous diving beetle in the family Dytiscidae. It is found in North America.
