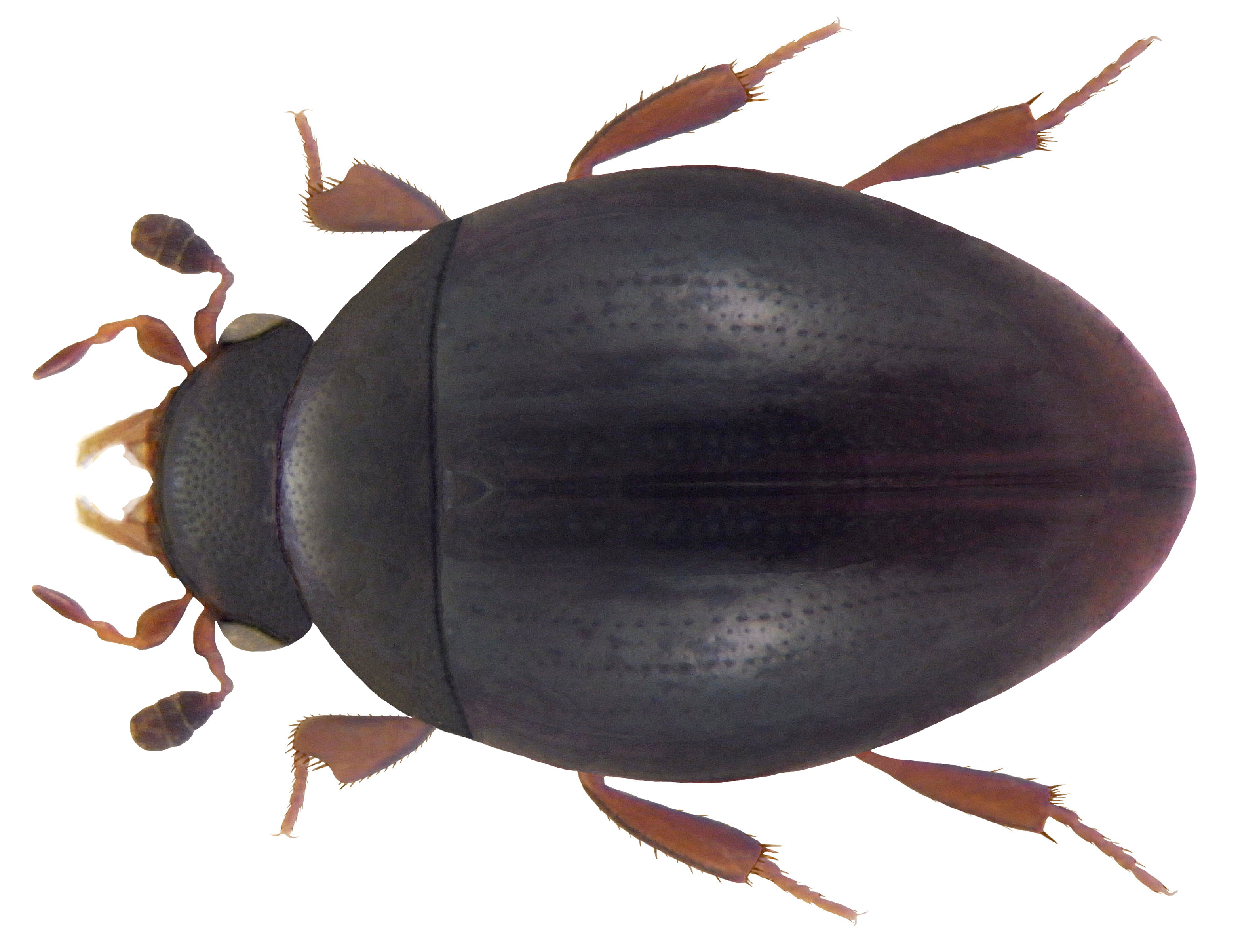
- Megasternum concinnum

Scientific classification
- Domain: Eukaryota
- Kingdom: Animalia
- Phylum: Arthropoda
- Class: Insecta
- Order: Coleoptera
- Suborder: Polyphaga
- Infraorder: Staphyliniformia
- Family: Hydrophilidae
- Tribe: Megasternini
- Genus: Megasternum; Mulsant, 1844

= Megasternum (beetle) =

Genus of beetles

Megasternum is a genus of water scavenger beetles in the family Hydrophilidae. There are at least four described species in Megasternum.

== Species ==
- Megasternum concinnum (Marsham, 1802)
- Megasternum obscurum
- Megasternum posticatum (Mannerheim, 1852)
- Megasternum punctulatum Horn, 1890
