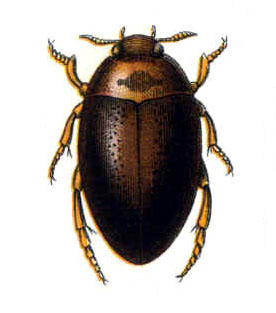
- Noterus clavicornis

Scientific classification
- Domain: Eukaryota
- Kingdom: Animalia
- Phylum: Arthropoda
- Class: Insecta
- Order: Coleoptera
- Suborder: Adephaga
- Family: Noteridae
- Genus: Noterus; Clairville, 1806

= Noterus =

Genus of beetles

Noterus is a genus of beetle native to the Palearctic (including Europe), the Near East and North Africa. It contains the following species:

- Noterus angustulus Zaitzev, 1953
- Noterus clavicornis (De Geer, 1774)
- Noterus crassicornis (O.F.Müller, 1776)
- Noterus granulatus Régimbart, 1883
- Noterus japonicus Sharp, 1873
- Noterus laevis Sturm, 1834
- Noterus ponticus Sharp, 1882
