= Oreodytes quadrimaculatus =

Scientific classification
- Domain: Eukaryota
- Kingdom: Animalia
- Phylum: Arthropoda
- Class: Insecta
- Order: Coleoptera
- Suborder: Adephaga
- Family: Dytiscidae
- Genus: Oreodytes
- Species: O. quadrimaculatus

Binomial name
- Oreodytes quadrimaculatus (Horn, 1883)

Synonyms
- Hydroporus brodei Gellermann, 1928

Species of beetle

Oreodytes quadrimaculatus is a species of predaceous diving beetle in the family Dytiscidae. It is found in North America.
