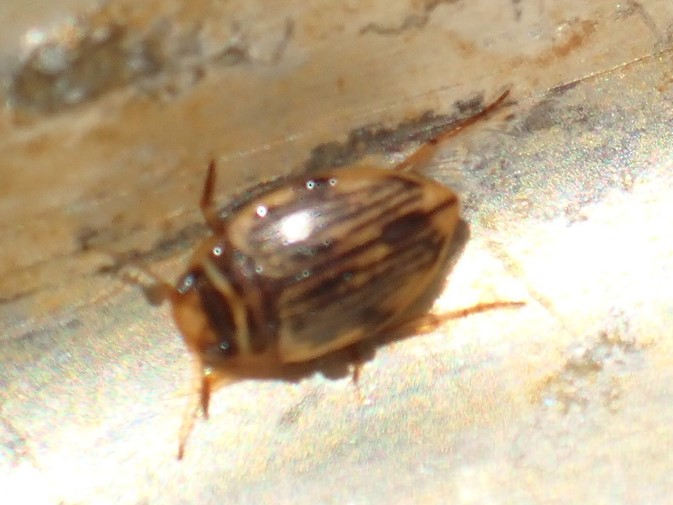

Scientific classification
- Kingdom: Animalia
- Phylum: Arthropoda
- Class: Insecta
- Order: Coleoptera
- Suborder: Adephaga
- Family: Dytiscidae
- Genus: Oreodytes
- Species: O. scitulus

Binomial name
- Oreodytes scitulus (LeConte, 1855)

= Oreodytes scitulus =

Species of beetle

Oreodytes scitulus is a species of predaceous diving beetle in the family Dytiscidae. It is found in North America.

== Subspecies ==
- Oreodytes scitulus bisulcatus (Fall, 1923)
- Oreodytes scitulus scitulus (LeConte, 1855)
