= Agabus kootenai =

Scientific classification
- Domain: Eukaryota
- Kingdom: Animalia
- Phylum: Arthropoda
- Class: Insecta
- Order: Coleoptera
- Suborder: Adephaga
- Family: Dytiscidae
- Genus: Agabus
- Species: A. kootenai

Binomial name
- Agabus kootenai Larson, 1991

Species of beetle

Agabus kootenai is a species of predaceous diving beetle in the family Dytiscidae. It is found in North America.
