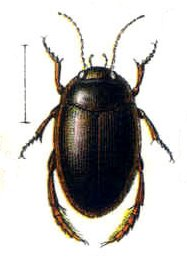

Scientific classification
- Kingdom: Animalia
- Phylum: Arthropoda
- Clade: Pancrustacea
- Class: Insecta
- Order: Coleoptera
- Suborder: Adephaga
- Family: Dytiscidae
- Genus: Agabus
- Subgenus: Acatodes
- Species: A. fuscipennis

Binomial name
- Agabus fuscipennis (Paykull, 1798)

= Agabus fuscipennis =

Species of beetle

Agabus fuscipennis is a species of beetle native to the Palearctic (including Europe) and the Nearctic. In Europe, it is only found in Austria, Belarus, the Czech Republic, mainland Denmark, Estonia, Finland, Germany, mainland Italy, Kaliningrad, Latvia, Lithuania, mainland Norway, Poland, Russia, Sardinia, Sicily, Slovakia, Sweden, and Ukraine.
