= Oreodytes alaskanus =

Scientific classification
- Domain: Eukaryota
- Kingdom: Animalia
- Phylum: Arthropoda
- Class: Insecta
- Order: Coleoptera
- Suborder: Adephaga
- Family: Dytiscidae
- Genus: Oreodytes
- Species: O. alaskanus

Binomial name
- Oreodytes alaskanus (Fall, 1926)

Synonyms
- Hydroporus alaskanus Fall, 1926; Hydroporus kincaidi Hatch, 1928; Hydroporus rainieri Hatch, 1928

Species of beetle

Oreodytes alaskanus is a species of predaceous diving beetle in the family Dytiscidae. It is found in North America.
