= Agabus obliteratus =

Scientific classification
- Domain: Eukaryota
- Kingdom: Animalia
- Phylum: Arthropoda
- Class: Insecta
- Order: Coleoptera
- Suborder: Adephaga
- Family: Dytiscidae
- Genus: Agabus
- Species: A. obliteratus

Binomial name
- Agabus obliteratus LeConte, 1859

Species of beetle

Agabus obliteratus is a species in the family Dytiscidae ("predaceous diving beetles"), in the order Coleoptera ("beetles"). It is found in North America.

A subspecies of Agabus obliteratus is A. obliteratus nectris Leech, 1942.
