= Oreodytes angustior =

Scientific classification
- Domain: Eukaryota
- Kingdom: Animalia
- Phylum: Arthropoda
- Class: Insecta
- Order: Coleoptera
- Suborder: Adephaga
- Family: Dytiscidae
- Genus: Oreodytes
- Species: O. angustior

Binomial name
- Oreodytes angustior (Hatch, 1928)

Synonyms
- Hydroporus angustior Hatch, 1928

Species of beetle

Oreodytes angustior is a species of predaceous diving beetle in the family Dytiscidae. It is found in North America.
