= Agabus africanus =

Scientific classification
- Kingdom: Animalia
- Phylum: Arthropoda
- Class: Insecta
- Order: Coleoptera
- Suborder: Adephaga
- Family: Dytiscidae
- Genus: Agabus
- Subgenus: Agabus
- Species: A. africanus

Binomial name
- Agabus africanus Pederzani & Schizzerotto, 1998

Species of beetle

Agabus africanus is a species of predatory diving beetle belonging to the family Dytiscidae. It is endemic to Tunisia, where it is found in the area of the Cap Bon peninsula. It is not common.
