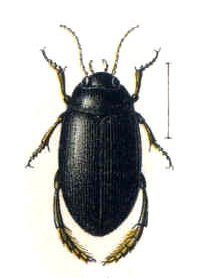

Scientific classification
- Domain: Eukaryota
- Kingdom: Animalia
- Phylum: Arthropoda
- Class: Insecta
- Order: Coleoptera
- Suborder: Adephaga
- Family: Dytiscidae
- Genus: Agabus
- Subgenus: Gaurodytes
- Species: A. melanarius

Binomial name
- Agabus melanarius Aubé, 1837

Synonyms
- Agabus tarsatus Zetterstedt, 1838

= Agabus melanarius =

Species of beetle

Agabus melanarius is a species of beetle in the family Dytiscidae. It is widespread in Europe, primarily in the northern and central Europe.

Agabus melanarius measure 8–9.5 mm (0.31–0.37 in). The species can be found in small ponds, springs and even small lakes. It is often associated with spring-fed, cold habitats.
