= Agabus klamathensis =

Scientific classification
- Domain: Eukaryota
- Kingdom: Animalia
- Phylum: Arthropoda
- Class: Insecta
- Order: Coleoptera
- Suborder: Adephaga
- Family: Dytiscidae
- Genus: Agabus
- Species: A. klamathensis

Binomial name
- Agabus klamathensis Larson and Leech, 1989

Species of beetle

Agabus klamathensis is a species of predacious diving beetle belonging to the family Dytiscidae. This species is found in springs, creeks, rivers, and pools in northern California and southwestern Oregon.

Agabus klamathensis is named for Klamath County, Oregon, where the type specimen was collected.
