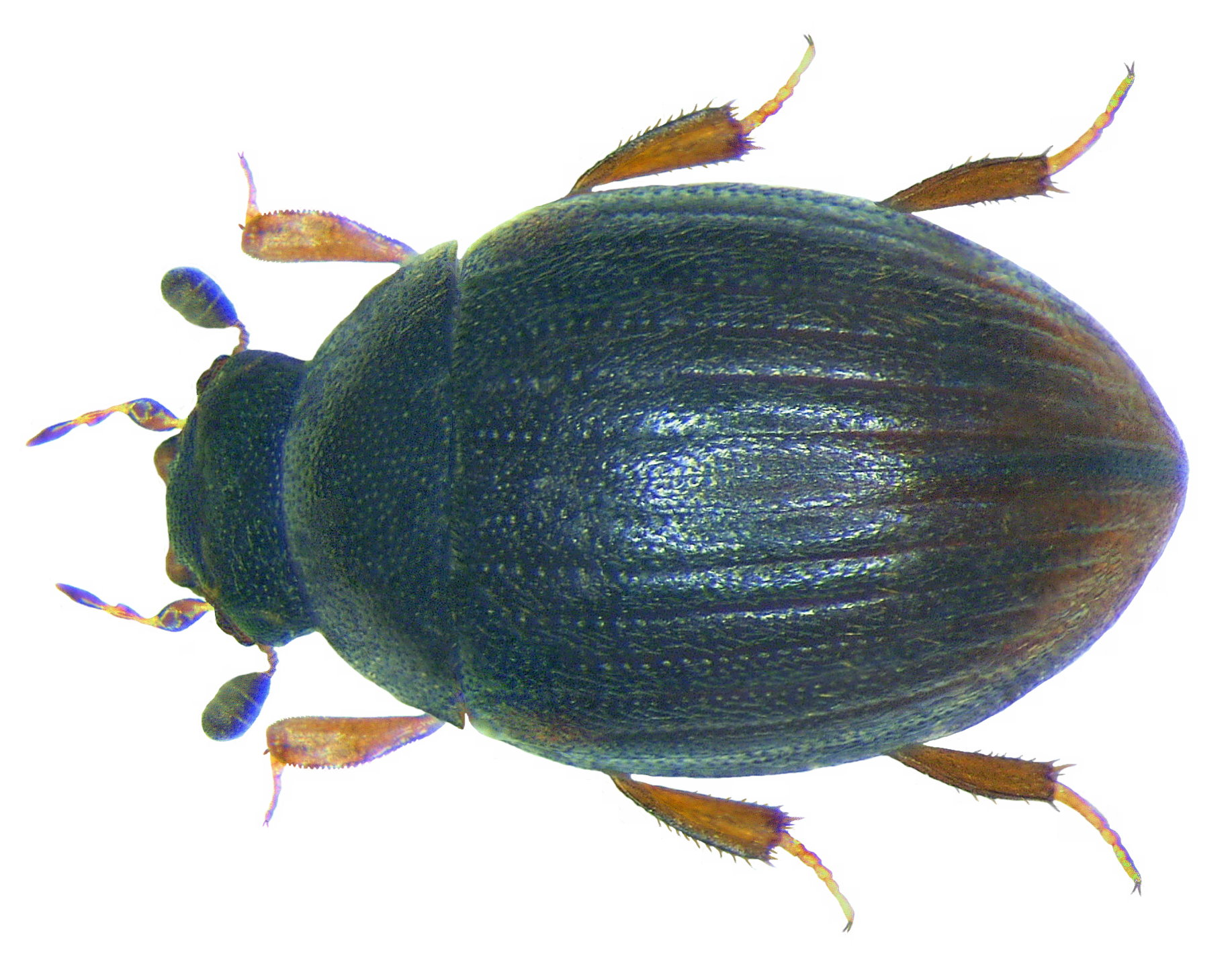
- Cryptopleurum minutum

Scientific classification
- Domain: Eukaryota
- Kingdom: Animalia
- Phylum: Arthropoda
- Class: Insecta
- Order: Coleoptera
- Suborder: Polyphaga
- Infraorder: Staphyliniformia
- Family: Hydrophilidae
- Tribe: Megasternini
- Genus: Cryptopleurum; Mulsant, 1844

= Cryptopleurum =

Genus of beetles

Cryptopleurum is a genus of water scavenger beetles in the family Hydrophilidae. There are about 11 described species in Cryptopleurum.

== Species ==
These 11 species belong to the genus Cryptopleurum:

- Cryptopleurum americanum Horn, 1890
- Cryptopleurum cerei Schwarz
- Cryptopleurum crenatum (Kugelann, 1794)
- Cryptopleurum evansi Balfour-Browne, 1945
- Cryptopleurum fusciceps (Régimbart, 1907)
- Cryptopleurum impressum Sharp, 1882
- Cryptopleurum minutum (Fabricius, 1775)
- Cryptopleurum pygmaeum Orchymont, 1913
- Cryptopleurum subtile Sharp, 1884
- Cryptopleurum sulcatum Motschulsky, 1863
- Cryptopleurum vagans LeConte, 1855
