= Agabus adustus =

Scientific classification
- Kingdom: Animalia
- Phylum: Arthropoda
- Class: Insecta
- Order: Coleoptera
- Suborder: Adephaga
- Family: Dytiscidae
- Genus: Agabus
- Subgenus: Gaurodytes
- Species: A. adustus

Binomial name
- Agabus adustus Guignot, 1954

Species of beetle

Agabus adustus is a species of predatory diving beetle belonging to the family Dytiscidae. It is restricted to the Himalayas.
