= Agabus ambiguus =

Scientific classification
- Domain: Eukaryota
- Kingdom: Animalia
- Phylum: Arthropoda
- Class: Insecta
- Order: Coleoptera
- Suborder: Adephaga
- Family: Dytiscidae
- Genus: Agabus
- Species: A. ambiguus

Binomial name
- Agabus ambiguus (Say, 1823)

Synonyms
- Colymbetes ambiguus Say, 1823; Agabus reticulatus Aubé, 1838; Agabus fimbriatus LeConte, 1850

Species of beetle

Agabus ambiguus is a species of predacious diving beetle belonging to the family Dytiscidae. This species occurs across the United States and Canada. It has been collected from depositional areas of springs, streams, and stream-fed ponds. Adults can be active in open water throughout winter.
