= Agabus tristis =

Scientific classification
- Domain: Eukaryota
- Kingdom: Animalia
- Phylum: Arthropoda
- Class: Insecta
- Order: Coleoptera
- Suborder: Adephaga
- Family: Dytiscidae
- Genus: Agabus
- Species: A. tristis

Binomial name
- Agabus tristis Aubé, 1838

Species of beetle

Agabus tristis is a species of predaceous diving beetle in the family Dytiscidae. It is found in North America and the Palearctic.
