= Agabus clavicornis =

Scientific classification
- Kingdom: Animalia
- Phylum: Arthropoda
- Class: Insecta
- Order: Coleoptera
- Suborder: Adephaga
- Family: Dytiscidae
- Genus: Agabus
- Species: A. clavicornis

Binomial name
- Agabus clavicornis Sharp, 1882

Synonyms
- Agabus verus Brown, 1931

Species of beetle

Agabus clavicornis is a species of predaceous diving beetle in the family Dytiscidae. It is found in North America and the Palearctic.
