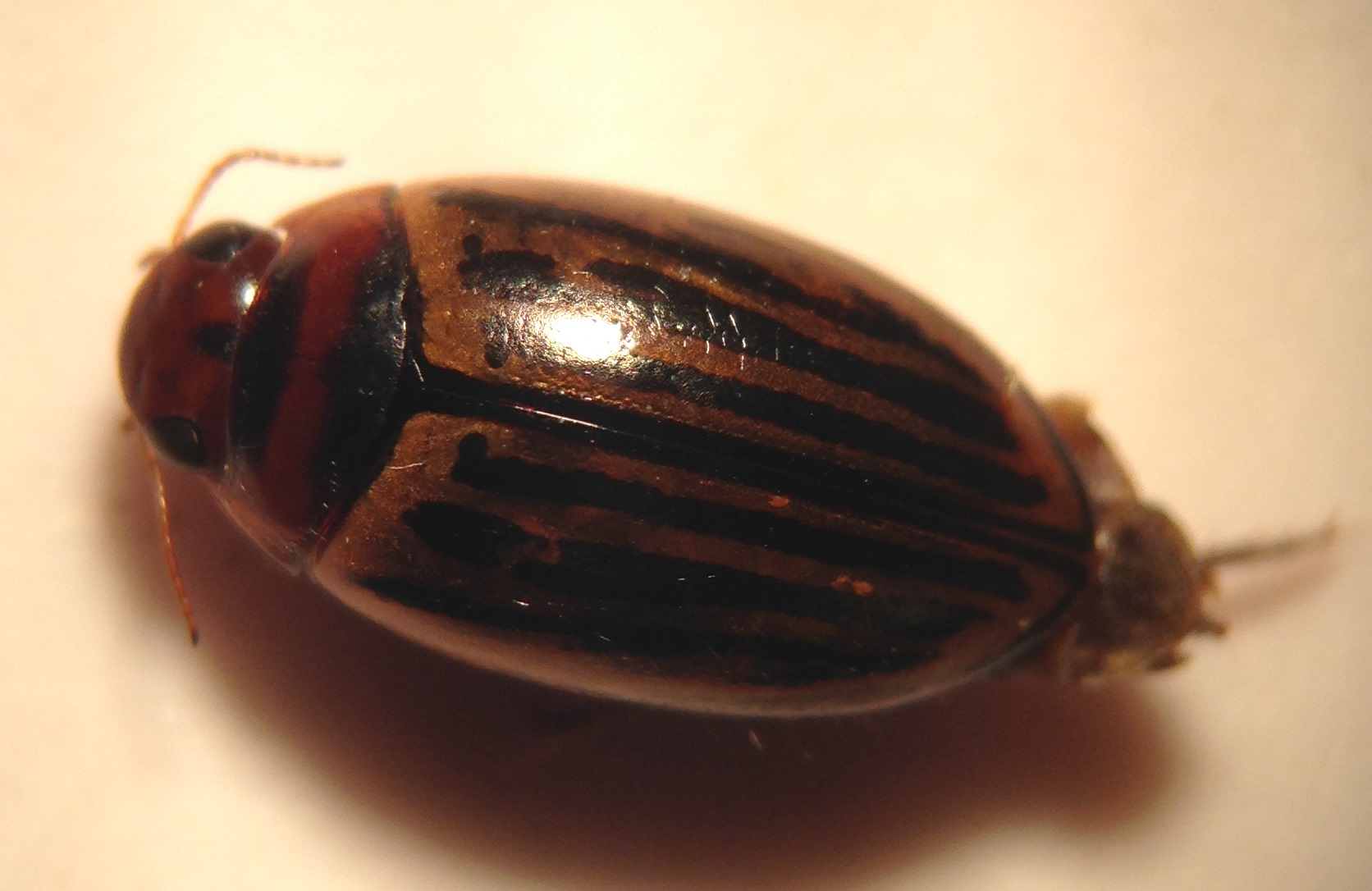

Scientific classification
- Domain: Eukaryota
- Kingdom: Animalia
- Phylum: Arthropoda
- Class: Insecta
- Order: Coleoptera
- Suborder: Adephaga
- Family: Dytiscidae
- Genus: Agabus
- Species: A. disintegratus

Binomial name
- Agabus disintegratus (Crotch, 1873)

= Agabus disintegratus =

Species of beetle

Agabus disintegratus, the disintegrated diving beetle, is a species of predaceous diving beetle in the family Dytiscidae occurring in North America.
