= Agabus elongatus =

Scientific classification
- Kingdom: Animalia
- Phylum: Arthropoda
- Class: Insecta
- Order: Coleoptera
- Suborder: Adephaga
- Family: Dytiscidae
- Genus: Agabus
- Species: A. elongatus

Binomial name
- Agabus elongatus (Gyllenhal, 1826)

Synonyms
- Agabus bryanti Carr, 1930

Species of beetle

Agabus elongatus is a species of predaceous diving beetle in the family Dytiscidae. It is found in North America and the Palearctic.
