= Agabus punctulatus =

Scientific classification
- Kingdom: Animalia
- Phylum: Arthropoda
- Clade: Pancrustacea
- Class: Insecta
- Order: Coleoptera
- Suborder: Adephaga
- Family: Dytiscidae
- Genus: Agabus
- Species: A. punctulatus

Binomial name
- Agabus punctulatus Aubé, 1838

Species of beetle

Agabus punctulatus is a species of predaceous diving beetle in the family Dytiscidae. It is native to upper North America.

== Description ==
Found in fresh grassland ponds, this beetle ranges from 5.5 millimetres to 6.4mm in size. It can be identified by this small size as well as its black brown to dark red dorsal color. A greenish sheen has been observed on its thorax, covering pale elytra. The species displays sexual dimorphism, with males having claws on their hindlegs and a ventral tooth just below the apex on these claws. This claw with a tooth allows for simplified identification of the species in the field.

== Distribution and Habitat ==
Agabus punctulatus can be found mostly in Canada and Alaska, but its habitat extends down to the contiguous United States in a two-pronged fork pattern. In the west, it reaches as far south as New Mexico and California, but in the east, it only extends to New Jersey.
