= Oreodytes obesus =

Scientific classification
- Domain: Eukaryota
- Kingdom: Animalia
- Phylum: Arthropoda
- Class: Insecta
- Order: Coleoptera
- Suborder: Adephaga
- Family: Dytiscidae
- Genus: Oreodytes
- Species: O. obesus

Binomial name
- Oreodytes obesus (LeConte, 1866)

Synonyms
- Hydroporus obesus LeConte, 1866

Species of beetle

Oreodytes obesus is a species of predaceous diving beetle in the family Dytiscidae. It is found in North America.

== Subspecies ==
These two subspecies belong to the species Oreodytes obesus:

- Oreodytes obesus cordillerensis Larson, 1990
- Oreodytes obesus obesus (LeConte, 1866)
