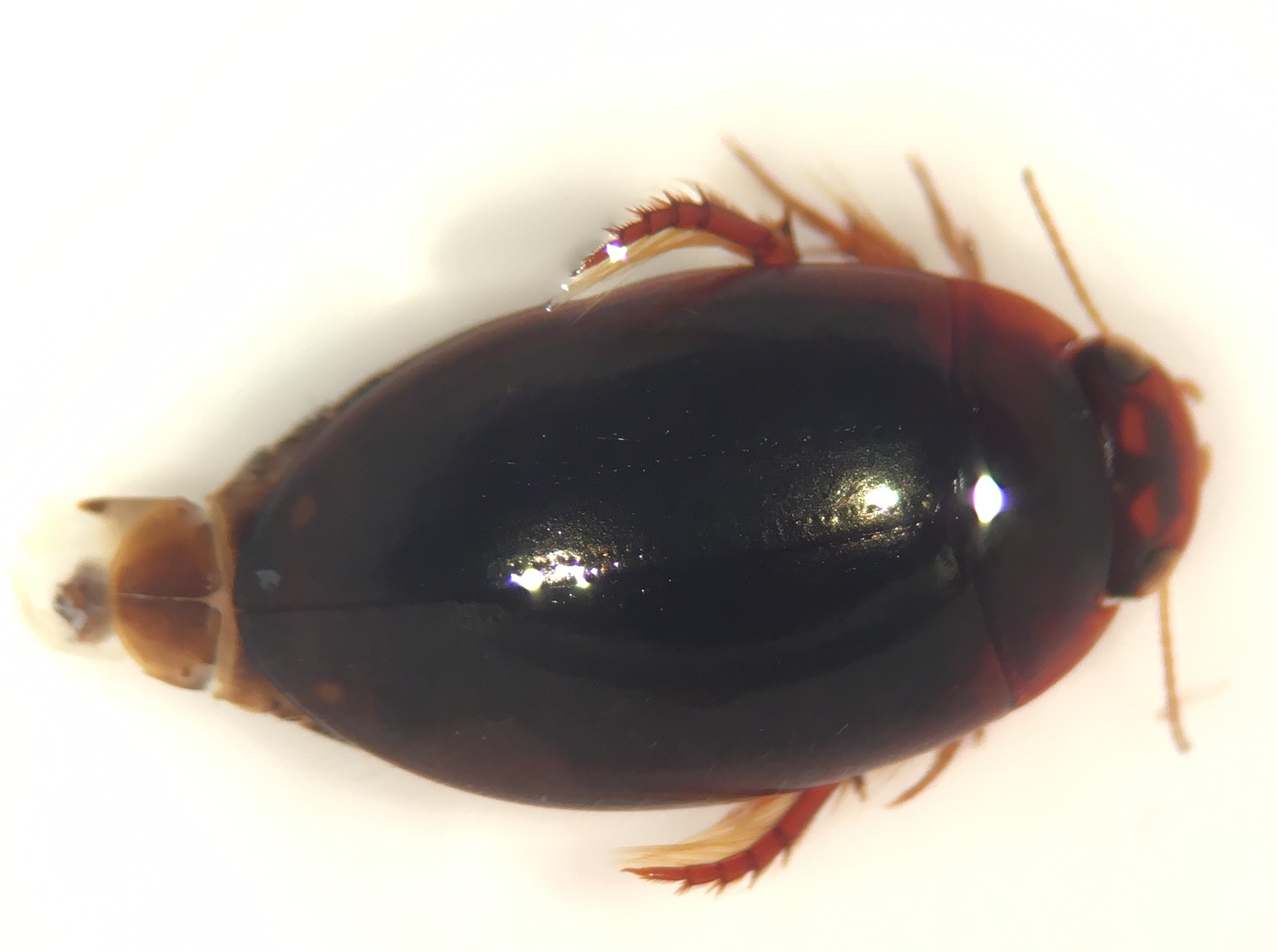

Scientific classification
- Domain: Eukaryota
- Kingdom: Animalia
- Phylum: Arthropoda
- Class: Insecta
- Order: Coleoptera
- Suborder: Adephaga
- Family: Dytiscidae
- Genus: Agabus
- Species: A. punctatus

Binomial name
- Agabus punctatus F. E. Melsheimer, 1844

= Agabus punctatus =

Species of beetle

Agabus punctatus is a species of predaceous diving beetle in the family Dytiscidae. It is found in North America.
