= Agabus confinis =

Scientific classification
- Kingdom: Animalia
- Phylum: Arthropoda
- Class: Insecta
- Order: Coleoptera
- Suborder: Adephaga
- Family: Dytiscidae
- Genus: Agabus
- Species: A. confinis

Binomial name
- Agabus confinis (Gyllenhal, 1808)

Species of beetle

Agabus confinis is a species of predaceous diving beetle in the family Dytiscidae. It is found in North America and the Palearctic.
