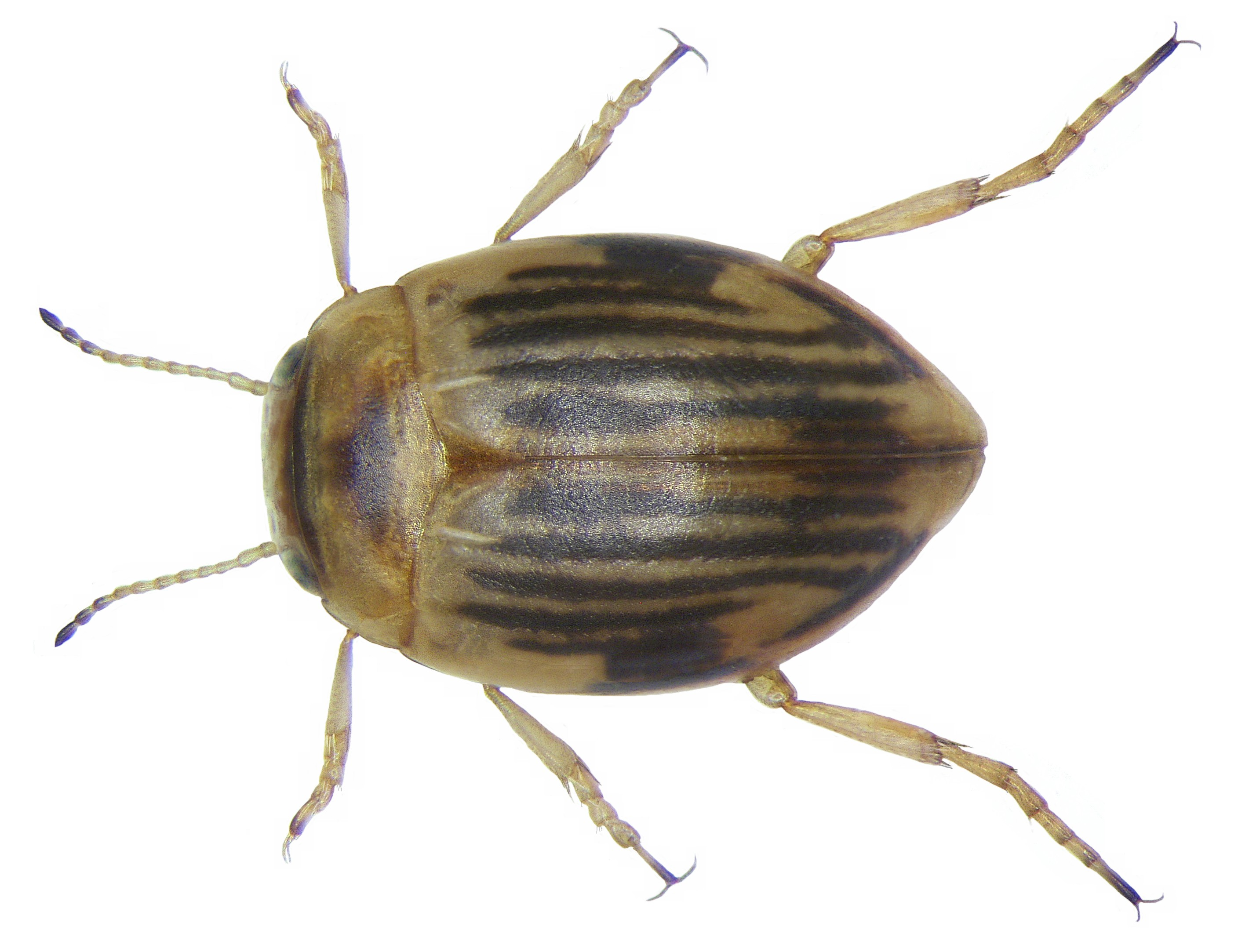
- Oreodytes sanmarkii

Scientific classification
- Kingdom: Animalia
- Phylum: Arthropoda
- Class: Insecta
- Order: Coleoptera
- Suborder: Adephaga
- Family: Dytiscidae
- Subfamily: Hydroporinae
- Tribe: Hydroporini
- Subtribe: Deronectina
- Genus: Oreodytes; Seidlitz, 1887

= Oreodytes =

Genus of beetles

Oreodytes is a genus of beetles in the family Dytiscidae, containing the following species:

- Oreodytes abbreviatus (Fall, 1923)
- Oreodytes alaskanus (Fall, 1926)
- Oreodytes alpinus (Paykull, 1798)
- Oreodytes angustior (Hatch, 1928)
- Oreodytes babai (Satô, 1990)
- Oreodytes congruus (LeConte, 1878)
- Oreodytes crassulus (Fall, 1923)
- Oreodytes dauricus (Motschulsky, 1860)
- Oreodytes davisii (Curtis, 1831)
- Oreodytes humboldtensis Zimmerman, 1985
- Oreodytes jakovlevi (Zaitzev, 1905)
- Oreodytes kanoi (Kamiya, 1938)
- Oreodytes laevis (Kirby, 1837)
- Oreodytes meridionalis Binaghi & Sanfilippo, 1971
- Oreodytes mongolicus (Brinck, 1943)
- Oreodytes natrix (Sharp, 1884)
- Oreodytes obesus (LeConte, 1866)
- Oreodytes okulovi Lafer, 1988
- Oreodytes picturatus (Horn, 1883)
- Oreodytes productotruncatus (Hatch, 1944)
- Oreodytes quadrimaculatus (Horn, 1883)
- Oreodytes rhyacophilus Zimmerman, 1985
- Oreodytes sanmarkii (C.R.Sahlberg, 1826)
- Oreodytes scitulus (LeConte, 1855)
- Oreodytes septentrionalis (Gyllenhal, 1826)
- Oreodytes shorti Shaverdo & Fery, 2006
- Oreodytes sierrae Zimmerman, 1985
- Oreodytes snoqualmie (Hatch, 1933)
- Oreodytes subrotundus (Fall, 1923)
