= Megasternum posticatum =

Scientific classification
- Domain: Eukaryota
- Kingdom: Animalia
- Phylum: Arthropoda
- Class: Insecta
- Order: Coleoptera
- Suborder: Polyphaga
- Infraorder: Staphyliniformia
- Family: Hydrophilidae
- Genus: Megasternum
- Species: M. posticatum

Binomial name
- Megasternum posticatum (Mannerheim, 1852)

Synonyms
- Megasternum pugetense Hatch, 1946

Species of beetle

Megasternum posticatum is a species of water scavenger beetle in the family Hydrophilidae. It is found in North America.
