= Agabus bifarius =

Scientific classification
- Kingdom: Animalia
- Phylum: Arthropoda
- Class: Insecta
- Order: Coleoptera
- Suborder: Adephaga
- Family: Dytiscidae
- Genus: Agabus
- Species: A. bifarius

Binomial name
- Agabus bifarius (Kirby, 1837)

Species of beetle

Agabus bifarius is a species of predaceous diving beetle in the family Dytiscidae. It is found in Europe and Northern Asia (excluding China) and North America.

ITIS Taxonomic note:

- North American locality given as latitude 54.
