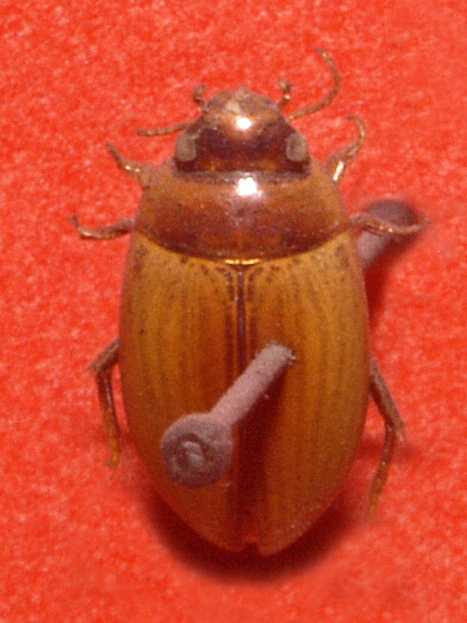
- Agabus paludosus. Museum specimen

Scientific classification
- Kingdom: Animalia
- Phylum: Arthropoda
- Class: Insecta
- Order: Coleoptera
- Suborder: Adephaga
- Family: Dytiscidae
- Genus: Agabus
- Subgenus: Gaurodytes
- Species: A. paludosus

Binomial name
- Agabus paludosus (Fabricius, 1801)

= Agabus paludosus =

Species of beetle

Agabus paludosus is a species of beetles belonging to the family Dytiscidae.

== Description ==
Agabus paludosus can reach a length of 6.5–8 millimetres (0.26–0.31 in). Head and pronotum are black, while elytrae are yellowish-brown.

== Distribution ==
This species is present in most of Europe, in the East Palearctic ecozone and in Near East.
