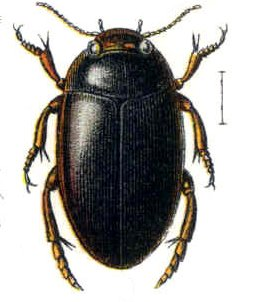

Scientific classification
- Kingdom: Animalia
- Phylum: Arthropoda
- Clade: Pancrustacea
- Class: Insecta
- Order: Coleoptera
- Suborder: Adephaga
- Family: Dytiscidae
- Genus: Agabus
- Subgenus: Gaurodytes
- Species: A. affinis

Binomial name
- Agabus affinis (Paykull, 1798)

= Agabus affinis =

Species of beetle

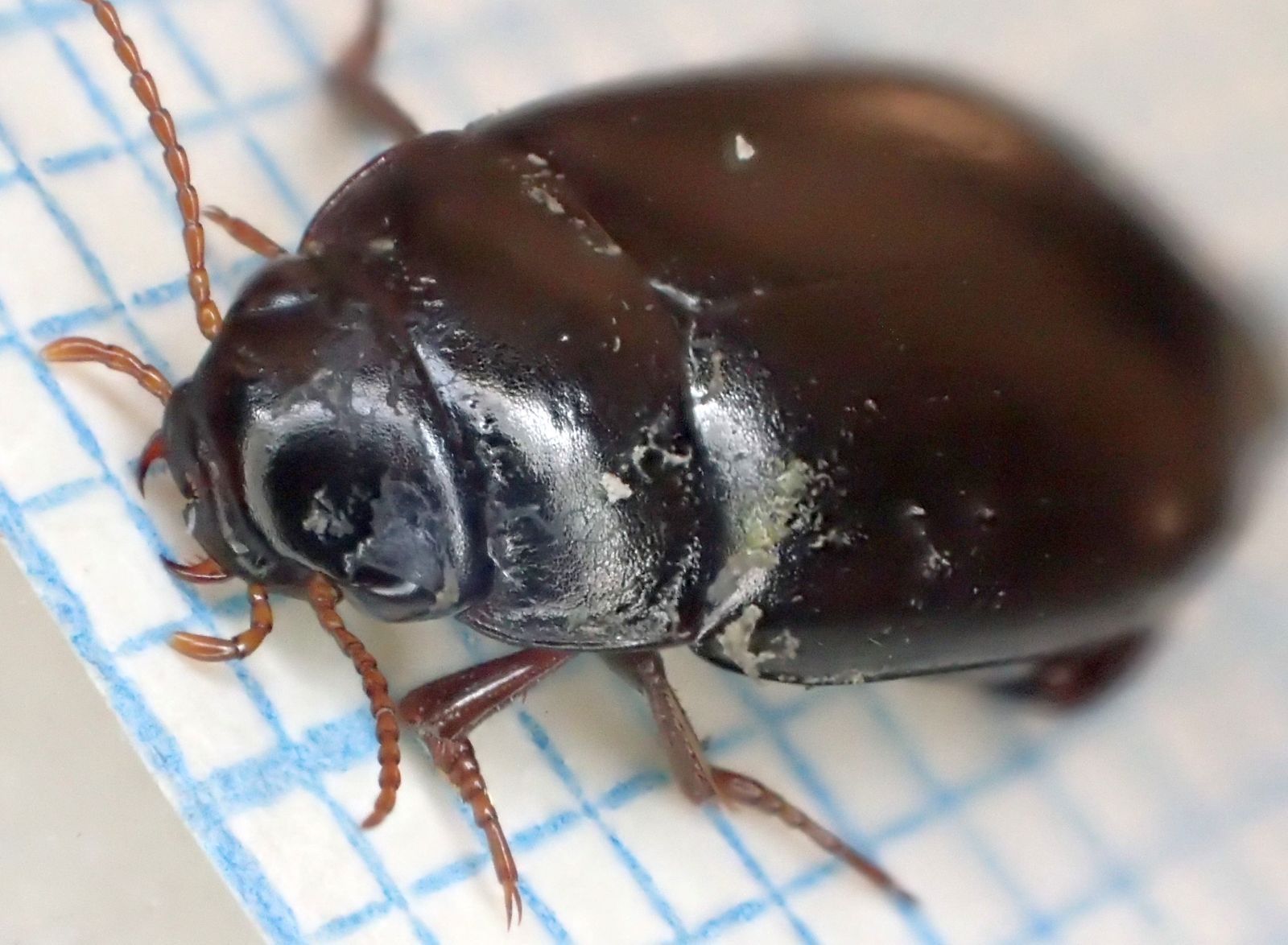
Agabus affinis male

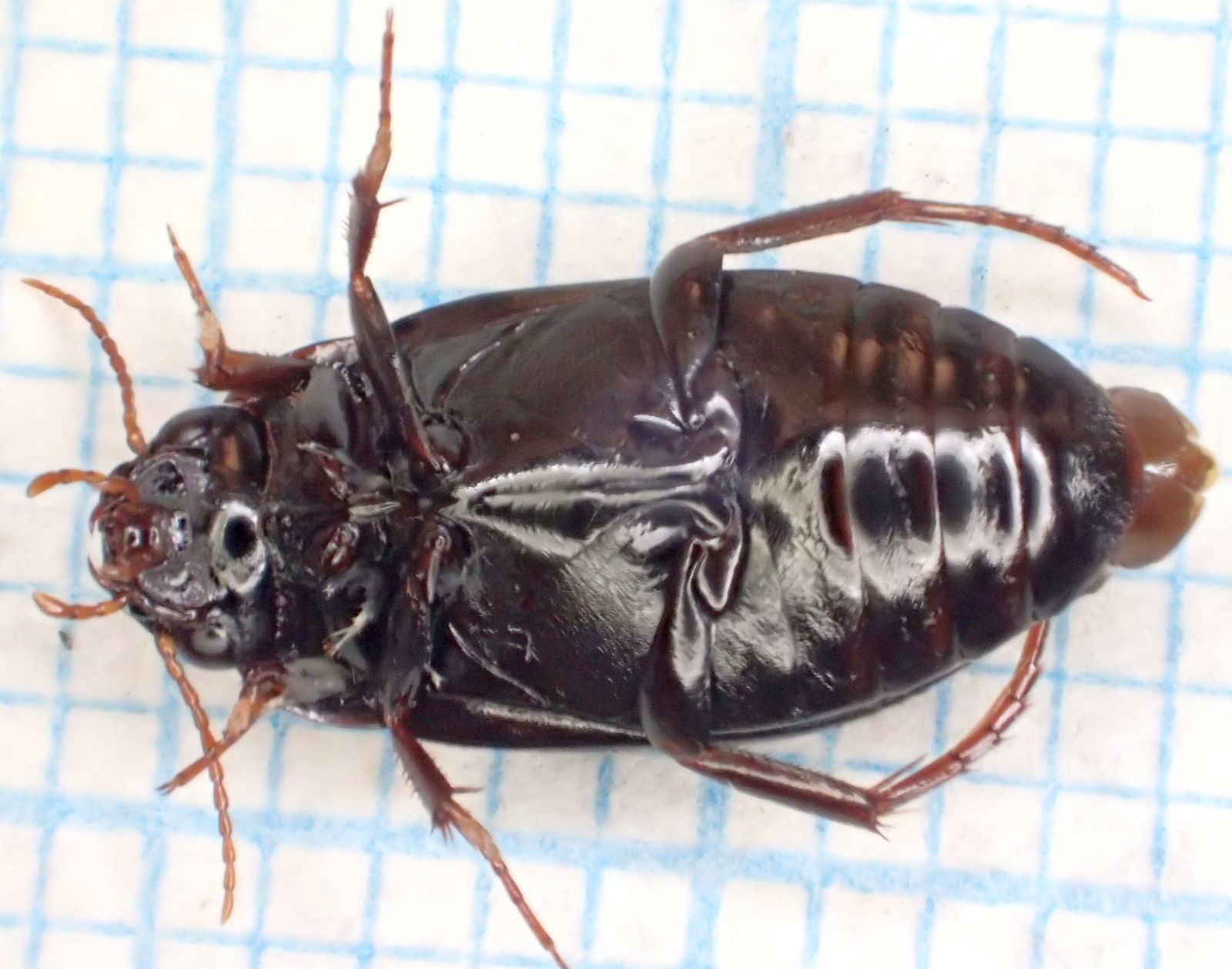
Agabus affinis male

Agabus affinis is a species of beetle native to the Palearctic (including Europe) and the Near East. In Europe, it is only found in Austria, Belarus, Belgium, Great Britain including Shetland, Orkney, Hebrides and Isle of Man, Croatia, the Czech Republic, mainland Danmark, Estonia, Finland, mainland France, Germany, Hungary, the Republic of Ireland, mainland Italy, Kaliningrad, Latvia, Lithuania, Northern Ireland, mainland Norway, Poland, Russia except the South, Slovakia, Sweden, Switzerland, the Netherlands, Ukraine, and Italy.
