= Agabus bipustulatus =

Scientific classification
- Kingdom: Animalia
- Phylum: Arthropoda
- Clade: Pancrustacea
- Class: Insecta
- Order: Coleoptera
- Suborder: Adephaga
- Family: Dytiscidae
- Genus: Agabus
- Subgenus: Gaurodytes
- Species: A. bipustulatus

Binomial name
- Agabus bipustulatus (Linnaeus, 1767)

Species of beetle

Agabus bipustulatus is a species of beetle native to the Palearctic (including Europe), the Afro-tropical region, the Near East and North Africa. In Europe, it is found everywhere except in several small countries and islands such as the Canary Islands, Franz Josef Land, Gibraltar, Madeira, Malta, Moldova, Monaco, the North Aegean islands, Novaya Zemlya, San Marino, the Selvagens Islands, Svalbard and Jan Mayen, and Vatican City.
