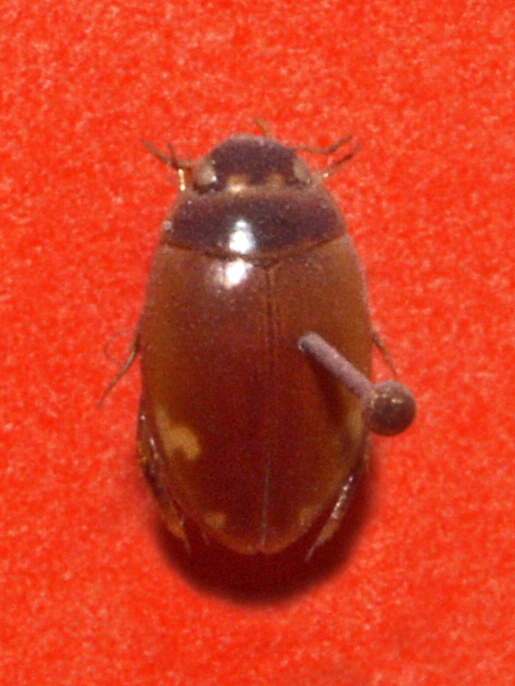
- Agabus didymus. Museum specimen

Scientific classification
- Kingdom: Animalia
- Phylum: Arthropoda
- Clade: Pancrustacea
- Class: Insecta
- Order: Coleoptera
- Suborder: Adephaga
- Family: Dytiscidae
- Genus: Agabus
- Subgenus: Gaurodytes
- Species: A. didymus

Binomial name
- Agabus didymus (Olivier 1795)

= Agabus didymus =

Species of beetle

Agabus didymus is a species of beetles belonging to the family Dytiscidae.

== Description ==
Agabus didymus can reach a length of 7–8 millimetres (0.28–0.31 in). The head is black. The pronotum is dark with reddish lateral margins and base. Elytrae have three rows of punctures and characteristic lateral and subapical translucent cream N-shaped marks.

== Distribution ==
This species is present in most of Europe, in the Near East and in North Africa.
