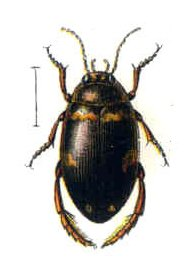

Scientific classification
- Domain: Eukaryota
- Kingdom: Animalia
- Phylum: Arthropoda
- Class: Insecta
- Order: Coleoptera
- Suborder: Adephaga
- Family: Dytiscidae
- Genus: Agabus
- Subgenus: Agabus
- Species: A. undulatus

Binomial name
- Agabus undulatus (Schrank, 1776)

= Agabus undulatus =

Species of beetle

Agabus undulatus is a species of beetle native to the Palearctic, including Europe, where it is only found in Albania, Austria, Belarus, Belgium, Bosnia and Herzegovina, Great Britain including Shetland, Orkney, Hebrides and Isle of Man, Bulgaria, Croatia, the Czech Republic, mainland Denmark, Estonia, mainland France, Germany, Hungary, mainland Italy, Kaliningrad, Latvia, Lithuania, Luxembourg, mainland Norway, Poland, Russia, Slovakia, Slovenia, Sweden, Switzerland, the Netherlands, and Ukraine.
