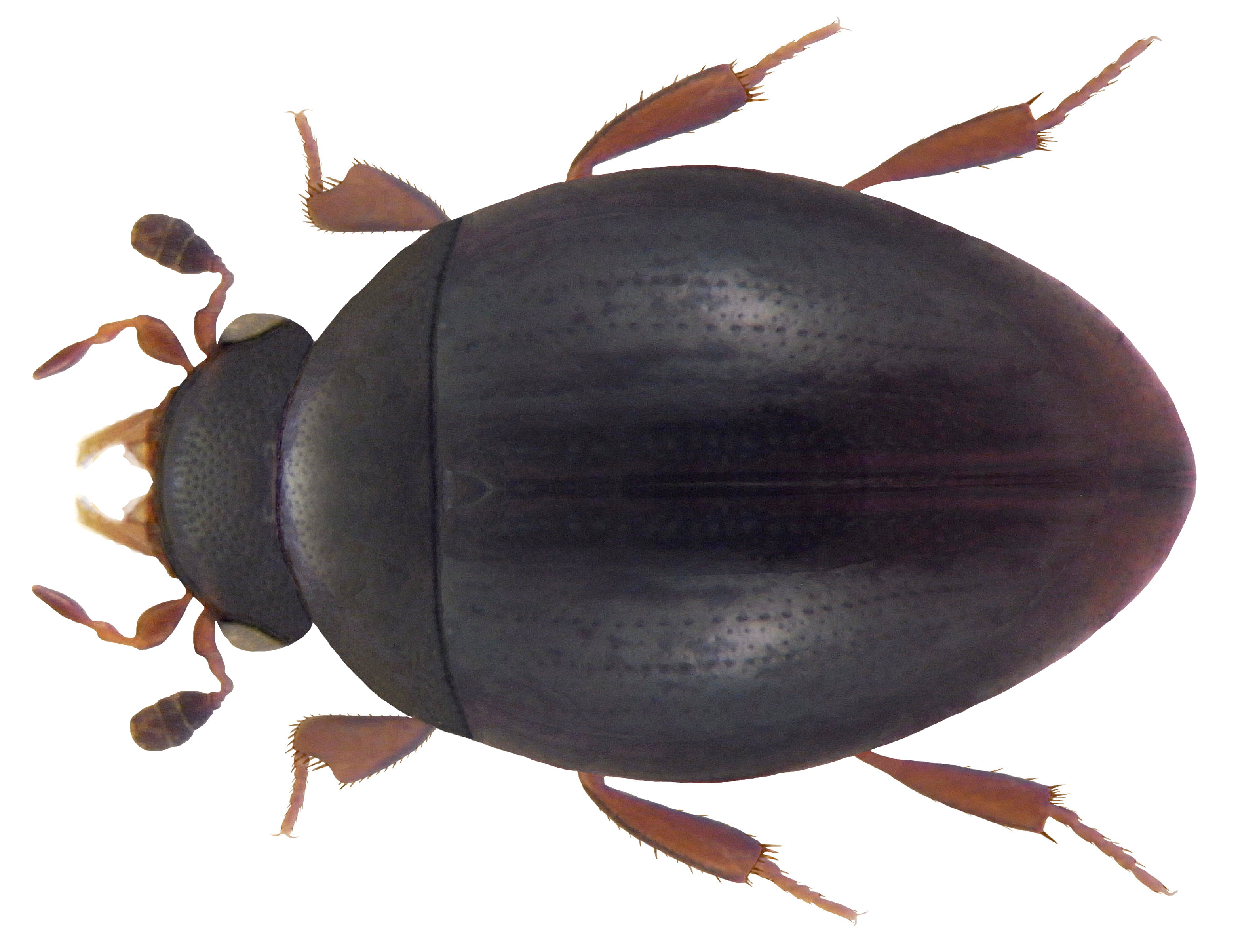

Scientific classification
- Domain: Eukaryota
- Kingdom: Animalia
- Phylum: Arthropoda
- Class: Insecta
- Order: Coleoptera
- Suborder: Polyphaga
- Infraorder: Staphyliniformia
- Family: Hydrophilidae
- Genus: Megasternum
- Species: M. concinnum

Binomial name
- Megasternum concinnum (Marsham, 1802)

= Megasternum concinnum =

Species of beetle

Megasternum concinnum is a species of water scavenger beetle in the family Hydrophilidae. It is found in Africa, Europe and Northern Asia (excluding China), and North America.
