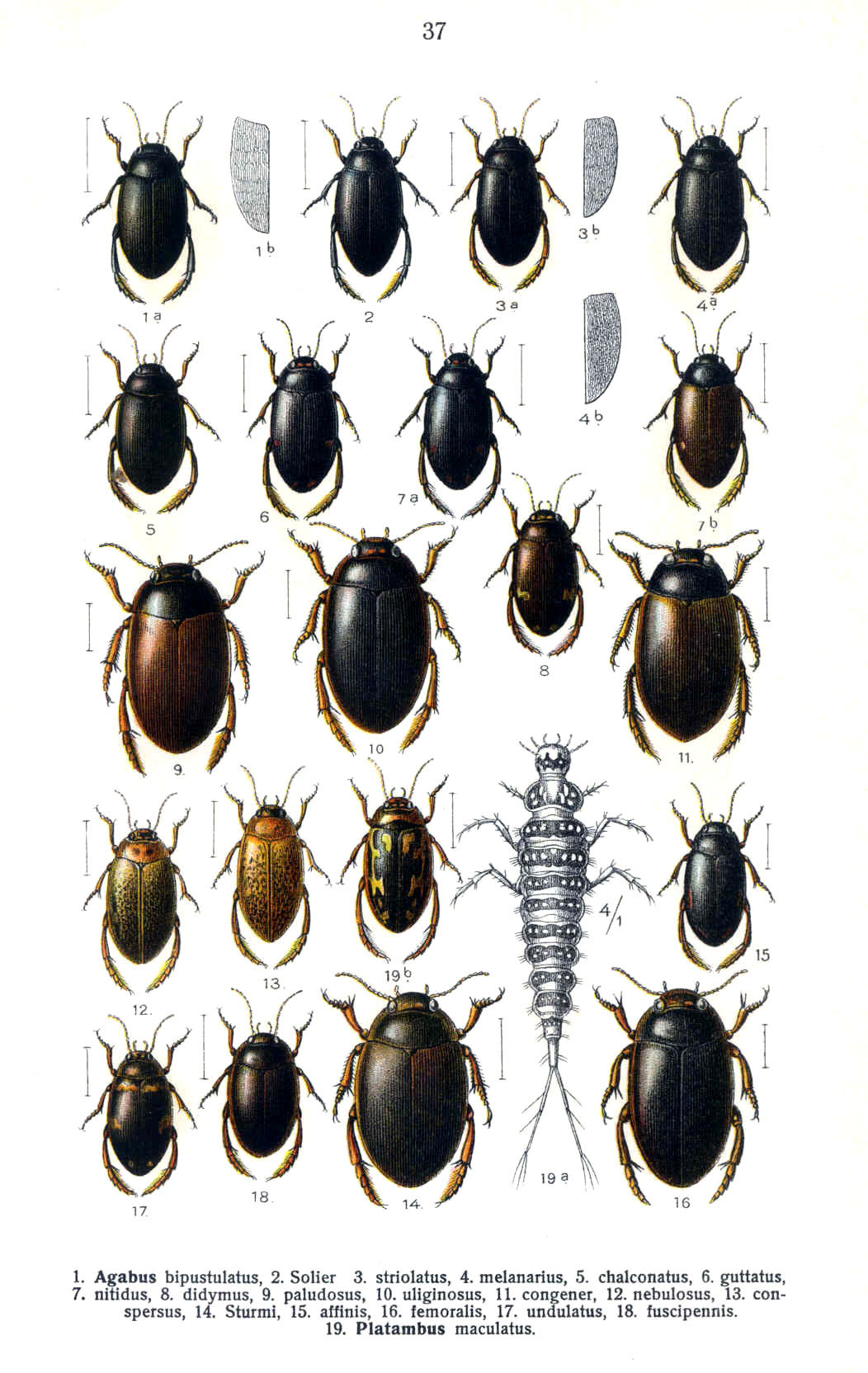
- Agabus bipustulatus

Scientific classification
- Kingdom: Animalia
- Phylum: Arthropoda
- Clade: Pancrustacea
- Class: Insecta
- Order: Coleoptera
- Suborder: Adephaga
- Family: Dytiscidae
- Genus: Agabus
- Species: A. biguttatus

Binomial name
- Agabus biguttatus (Olivier, 1795)

= Agabus biguttatus =

Species of beetle

Agabus biguttatus is a species of beetle belonging to the family Dytiscidae.

It is native to Europe.
