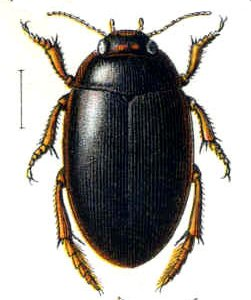

Scientific classification
- Kingdom: Animalia
- Phylum: Arthropoda
- Class: Insecta
- Order: Coleoptera
- Suborder: Adephaga
- Family: Dytiscidae
- Genus: Agabus
- Subgenus: Agabus
- Species: A. uliginosus

Binomial name
- Agabus uliginosus (Linnaeus, 1761)

= Agabus uliginosus =

Species of beetle

Agabus uliginosus is a species of beetle native to the Palearctic, including Europe, where it is only found in Austria, Belarus, Belgium, Great Britain including Shetland, Orkney, Hebrides and Isle of Man, Croatia, the Czech Republic, mainland Denmark, Estonia, Finland, mainland France, Germany, Hungary, Iceland, mainland Italy, Kaliningrad, Latvia, Lithuania, Luxembourg, mainland Norway, Poland, Romania, Russia, Slovakia, Slovenia, Sweden, Switzerland, the Netherlands, Ukraine and Yugoslavia.
