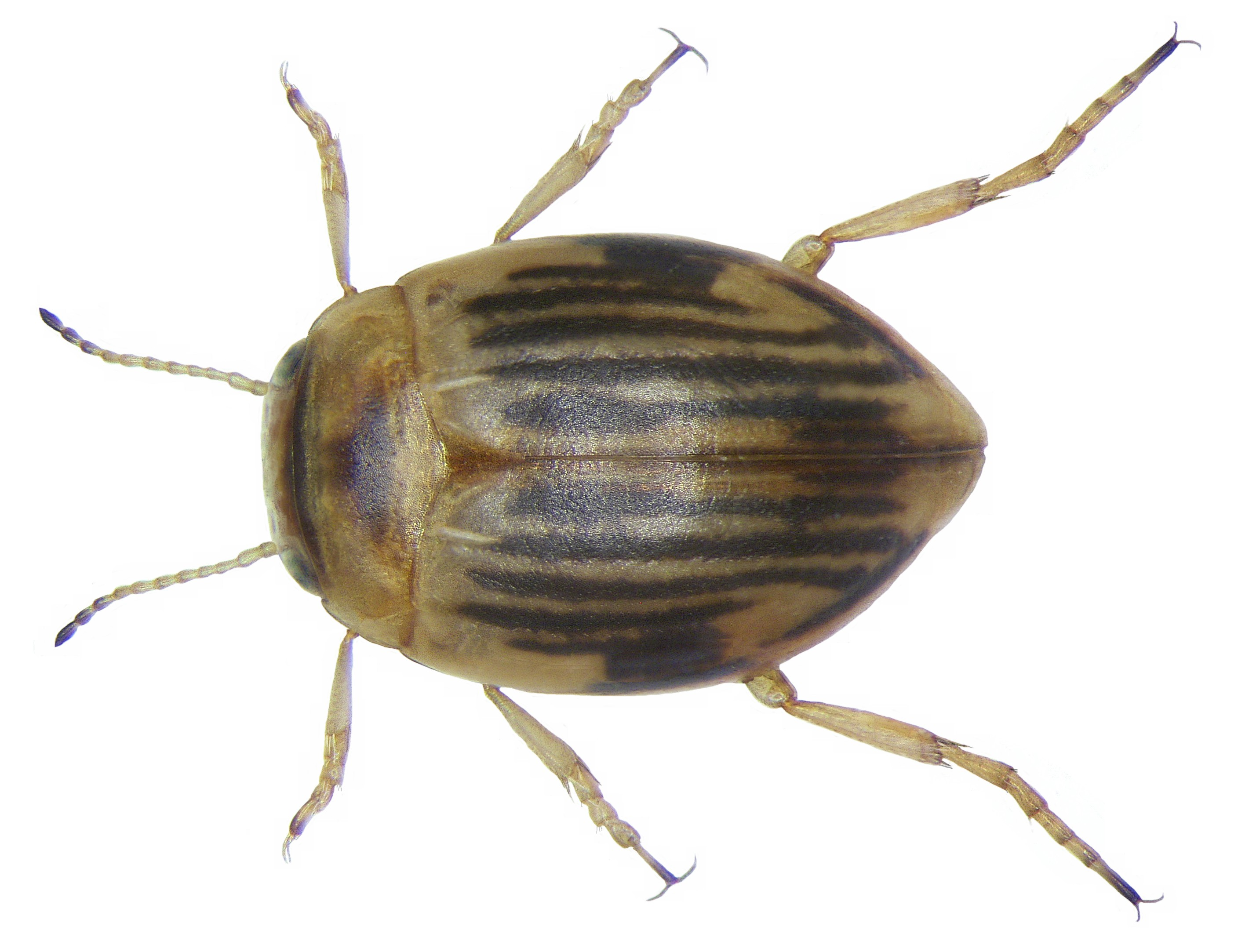

Scientific classification
- Domain: Eukaryota
- Kingdom: Animalia
- Phylum: Arthropoda
- Class: Insecta
- Order: Coleoptera
- Suborder: Adephaga
- Family: Dytiscidae
- Genus: Oreodytes
- Species: O. sanmarkii

Binomial name
- Oreodytes sanmarkii (C. R. Sahlberg, 1826)

Synonyms
- Hydroporus rivalis (Gyllenhal, 1827)

= Oreodytes sanmarkii =

Species of beetle

Oreodytes sanmarkii is a species of predaceous diving beetle in the family Dytiscidae. It has a holarctic distribution, found in aquatic habitats in Europe, northern Asia (excluding China), and North America. It has an affinity toward low-velocity currents and pebbly microhabitat substrates. It was described by Finnish entomologist Carl Reinhold Sahlberg in 1826.

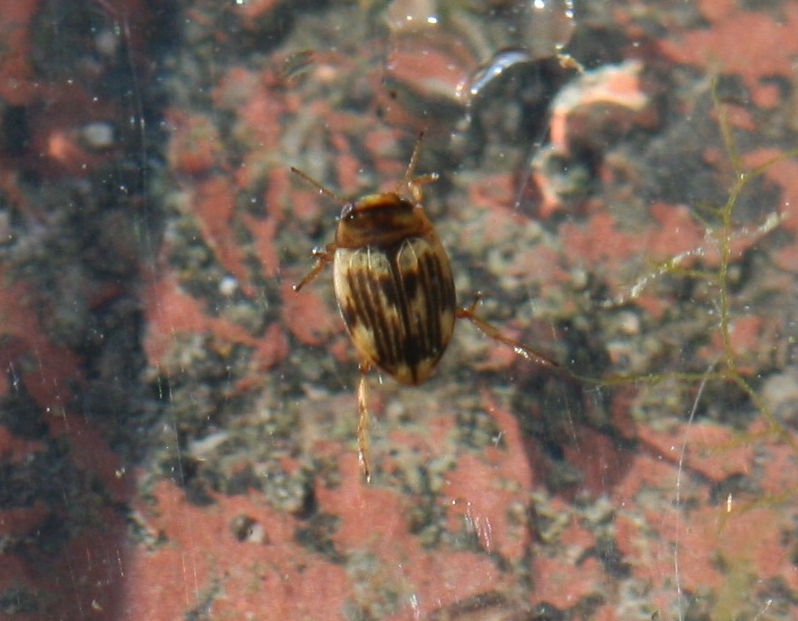

== Subspecies ==
There are two named subspecies of Oreodytes:

- Oreodytes sanmarkii alienus (Sharp, 1873)
- Oreodytes sanmarkii sanmarkii (C. R. Sahlberg, 1826)
