= Agabus anthracinus =

Scientific classification
- Domain: Eukaryota
- Kingdom: Animalia
- Phylum: Arthropoda
- Class: Insecta
- Order: Coleoptera
- Suborder: Adephaga
- Family: Dytiscidae
- Genus: Agabus
- Species: A. anthracinus

Binomial name
- Agabus anthracinus Mannerheim, 1852

Species of beetle

Agabus anthracinus is a species of predaceous diving beetle in the family Dytiscidae. It is widespread in northern North America, from northern United States to Canada and Alaska.
