= Ilybius discicolle =

Scientific classification
- Kingdom: Animalia
- Phylum: Arthropoda
- Class: Insecta
- Order: Coleoptera
- Suborder: Adephaga
- Family: Dytiscidae
- Genus: Ilybius
- Species: I. discicolle

Binomial name
- Ilybius discicolle (Ancey, 1882)

Synonyms
- Agabus discicollis

Species of beetle

Ilybius discicolle is a species of beetle in family Dytiscidae. It is endemic to Ethiopia.

Ilybius discicolle was formerly called Agabus discicollis.
