= Agabus brunneus =

Scientific classification
- Domain: Eukaryota
- Kingdom: Animalia
- Phylum: Arthropoda
- Class: Insecta
- Order: Coleoptera
- Suborder: Adephaga
- Family: Dytiscidae
- Genus: Agabus
- Species: A. brunneus

Binomial name
- Agabus brunneus Fabricius, 1768

Species of beetle

Agabus brunneus, the brown diving beetle, is a species of water beetle in the family Dytiscidae.

== Description ==
Adult beetles are 9 millimetres (0.35 in) in length.

== Distribution ==
The species lives in streams, mainly in Portreath (Portreath Stream), New Forest, and Dorset (in River Frome).
