= Agabus aequalis =

Scientific classification
- Kingdom: Animalia
- Phylum: Arthropoda
- Clade: Pancrustacea
- Class: Insecta
- Order: Coleoptera
- Suborder: Adephaga
- Family: Dytiscidae
- Genus: Agabus
- Subgenus: Gaurodytes
- Species: A. aequalis

Binomial name
- Agabus aequalis Sharp, 1882

Species of beetle

Agabus aequalis is a species of predatory diving beetle belonging to the family Dytiscidae. This species inhabits rivers and bogs. It has been found in Transbaikal, Primorsky Krai, and Sakhalin in the Russian Far East, Jilin and Sichuan provinces, China, and Arkhangai and Övörkhangai provinces, Mongolia.
