= Agabus arcticus =

Scientific classification
- Kingdom: Animalia
- Phylum: Arthropoda
- Clade: Pancrustacea
- Class: Insecta
- Order: Coleoptera
- Suborder: Adephaga
- Family: Dytiscidae
- Genus: Agabus
- Species: A. arcticus

Binomial name
- Agabus arcticus (Paykull, 1798)

Species of beetle

Agabus arcticus is a species of predaceous diving beetle in the family Dytiscidae. It is found in North America and the Palearctic.

== Subspecies ==
These three subspecies belong to the species Agabus arcticus:

- Agabus arcticus alpinus (Motschulsky, 1860)
- Agabus arcticus arcticus (Paykull, 1798)
- Agabus arcticus ochoticus Poppius, 1908
