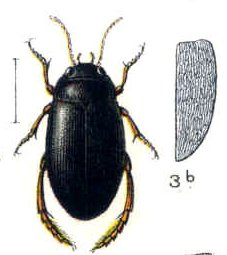

Scientific classification
- Kingdom: Animalia
- Phylum: Arthropoda
- Class: Insecta
- Order: Coleoptera
- Suborder: Adephaga
- Family: Dytiscidae
- Genus: Agabus
- Subgenus: Gaurodytes
- Species: A. striolatus

Binomial name
- Agabus striolatus (Gyllenhaal, 1808)

= Agabus striolatus =

Species of beetle

Agabus striolatus is a species of beetle endemic to Europe, where it is only found in Austria, Belarus, Belgium, Great Britain including Shetland, Orkney, Hebrides and Isle of Man, Croatia, the Czech Republic, mainland Denmark, Estonia, Finland, mainland France, Germany, Hungary, mainland Italy, Latvia, Lithuania, Poland, Russia except in the East, Slovakia, Sweden, the Netherlands and Ukraine.
