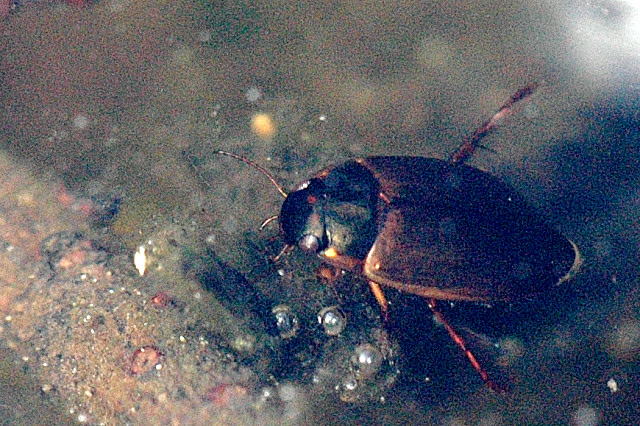

Scientific classification
- Kingdom: Animalia
- Phylum: Arthropoda
- Clade: Pancrustacea
- Class: Insecta
- Order: Coleoptera
- Suborder: Adephaga
- Family: Dytiscidae
- Genus: Agabus
- Subgenus: Acatodes
- Species: A. sturmii

Binomial name
- Agabus sturmii (Gyllenhaal, 1808)

= Agabus sturmii =

Species of beetle

Agabus sturmii is a species of beetle native to the Palearctic (including Europe) and the Near East. In Europe, it is only found in Austria, Belarus, Belgium, Bosnia and Herzegovina, Great Britain including Shetland, Orkney, Hebrides and Isle of Man, Bulgaria, Croatia, the Czech Republic, mainland Denmark, Estonia, Finland, mainland France, Germany, Hungary, the Republic of Ireland, mainland Italy, Kaliningrad, Latvia, Lithuania, Luxembourg, Northern Ireland, North Macedonia, mainland Norway, Poland, Russia, Slovakia, Slovenia, mainland Spain, Sweden, Switzerland, the Netherlands and Ukraine.
