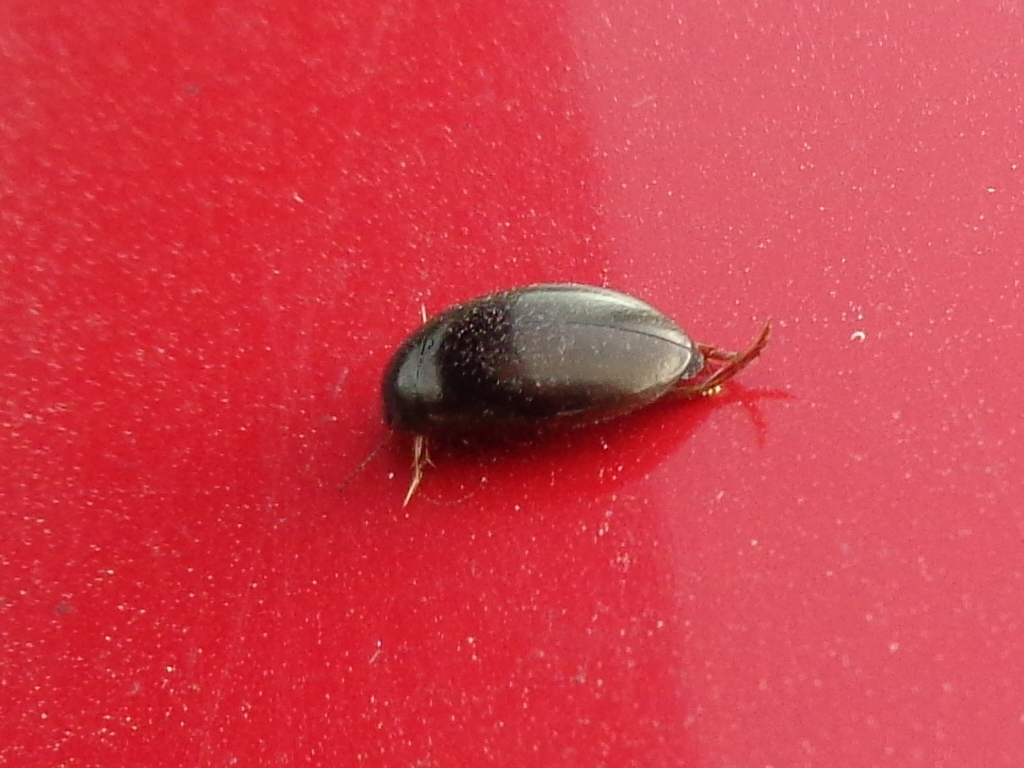

Scientific classification
- Domain: Eukaryota
- Kingdom: Animalia
- Phylum: Arthropoda
- Class: Insecta
- Order: Coleoptera
- Suborder: Adephaga
- Family: Dytiscidae
- Genus: Agabus
- Species: A. labiatus

Binomial name
- Agabus labiatus (Brahm, 1790)

= Agabus labiatus =

Species of beetles

Agabus labiatus is a species of beetle in the family Dytiscidae.
