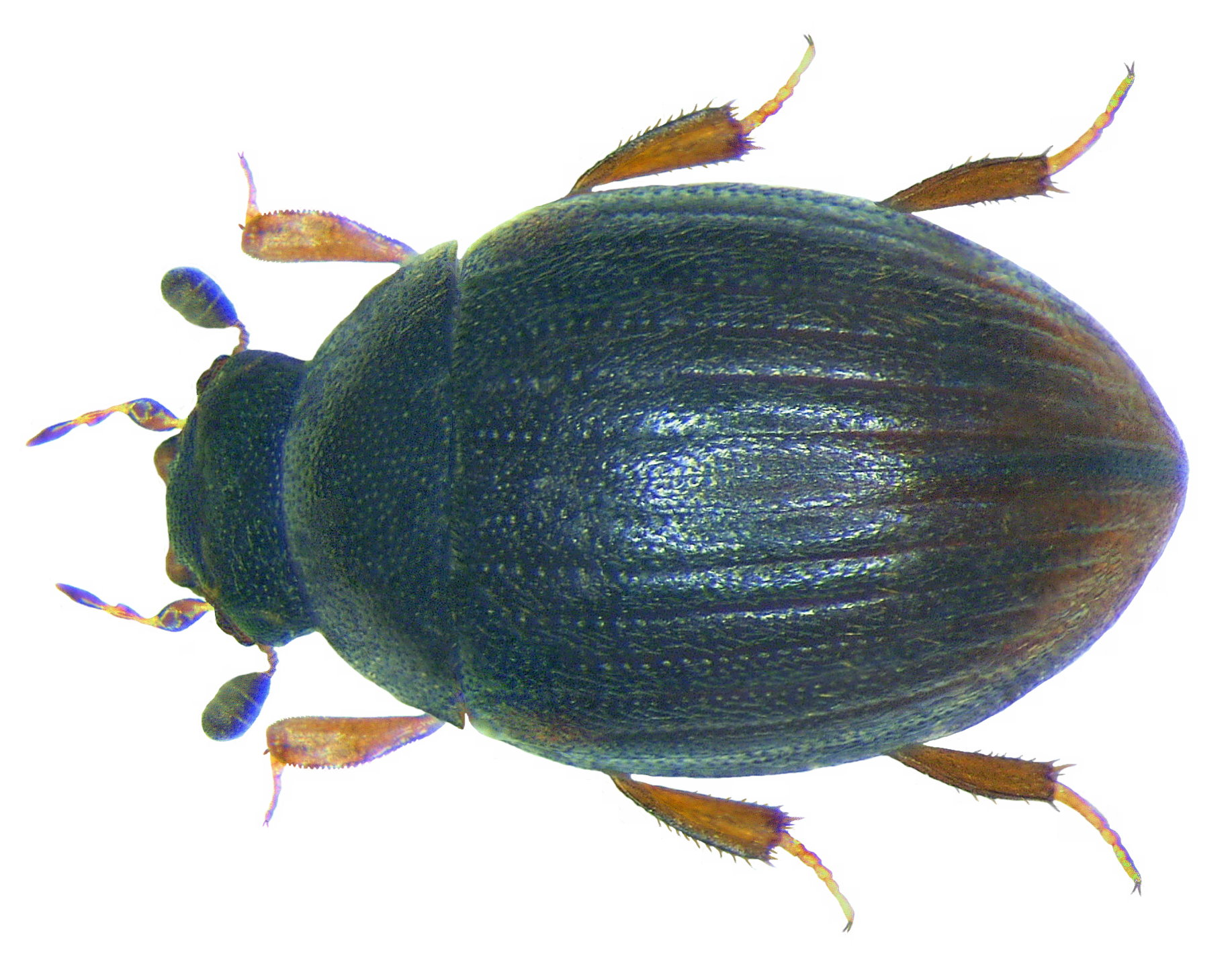

Scientific classification
- Domain: Eukaryota
- Kingdom: Animalia
- Phylum: Arthropoda
- Class: Insecta
- Order: Coleoptera
- Suborder: Polyphaga
- Infraorder: Staphyliniformia
- Family: Hydrophilidae
- Genus: Cryptopleurum
- Species: C. minutum

Binomial name
- Cryptopleurum minutum (Fabricius, 1775)

= Cryptopleurum minutum =

Species of beetle

Cryptopleurum minutum is a species of water scavenger beetle in the family Hydrophilidae. It is found in Europe and Northern Asia (excluding China) and North America.
