= Cryptopleurum subtile =

Scientific classification
- Kingdom: Animalia
- Phylum: Arthropoda
- Class: Insecta
- Order: Coleoptera
- Suborder: Polyphaga
- Infraorder: Staphyliniformia
- Family: Hydrophilidae
- Genus: Cryptopleurum
- Species: C. subtile

Binomial name
- Cryptopleurum subtile Sharp, 1884

Species of beetle

Cryptopleurum subtile is a species of water scavenger beetle in the family Hydrophilidae. It is found in Europe and Northern Asia (excluding China), North America, and Southern Asia.
