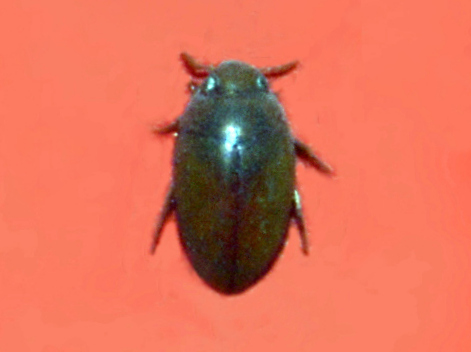
- Noterus clavicornis. Museum specimen

Scientific classification
- Domain: Eukaryota
- Kingdom: Animalia
- Phylum: Arthropoda
- Class: Insecta
- Order: Coleoptera
- Suborder: Adephaga
- Family: Noteridae
- Genus: Noterus
- Species: N. clavicornis

Binomial name
- Noterus clavicornis (De Geer, 1774)

= Noterus clavicornis =

Species of beetle

Noterus clavicornis is a species of beetle belonging to the family Noteridae.

== Description ==
Noterus clavicornis can reach a length of 4.2–4.5 millimetres (0.17–0.18 in). Body is egg-shaped and oval-stretched. The color is variable, ranging from yellowish to reddish brown. Pronotum is a slightly lighter than the elytrae. Both adults and larvae are aquatic and carnivorous. Adults can be found from March to October.

== Distribution ==
This species is native to the Palearctic (including Europe) and the Near East. In Europe, it is only found in Albania, Austria, the Balearic Islands, Belarus, Belgium, Bosnia and Herzegovina, Bulgaria, the Channel Islands, Corsica, Croatia, Czech Republic, mainland Danmark, Estonia, Finland, mainland France, Germany, Great Britain including the Isle of Man, mainland Greece, Hungary, the Republic of Ireland, mainland Italy, Latvia, Liechtenstein, Lithuania, Luxembourg, Moldova, Northern Ireland, North Macedonia, mainland Norway, Poland, mainland Portugal, Russia, Sardinia, Sicily, Slovakia, Slovenia, mainland Spain, Sweden, Switzerland, the Netherlands, Ukraine and Yugoslavia.

== Habitat ==
This species lives in ponds where vegetation abounds.

== Bibliography ==
- Harde, Severa: Der Kosmos Käferführer, Die mitteleuropäischen Käfer, Franckh-Kosmos Verlags-GmbH & Co, Stuttgart 2000, ISBN 3-440-06959-1
- Andres N. Nilsson: A World Catalogue of the Family Noteridae, or the Burrowing Water Beetles (Coleoptera, Adephaga) Version 16.VII.2006. 2006

== Gallery ==
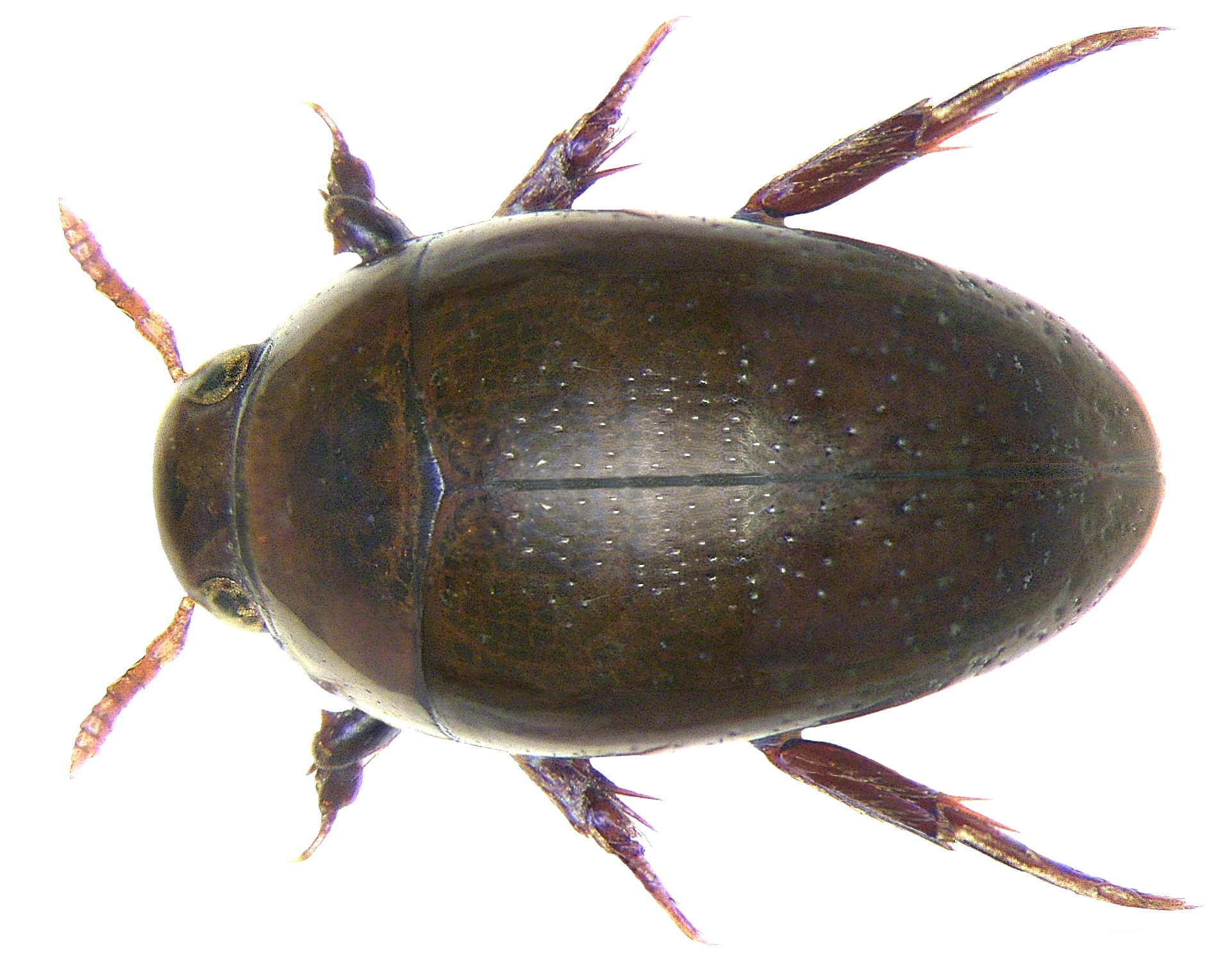

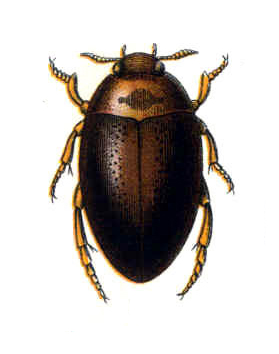

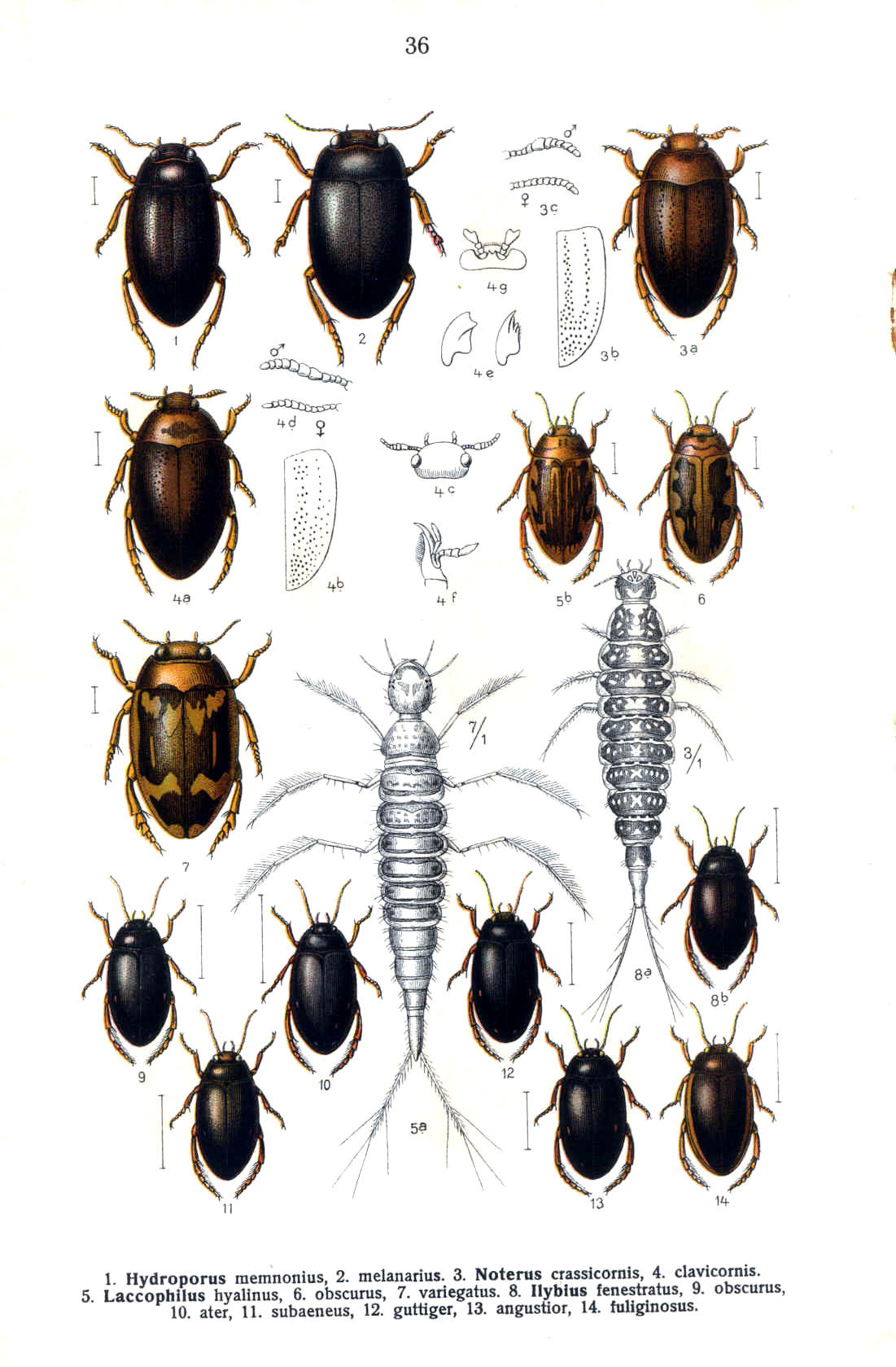
