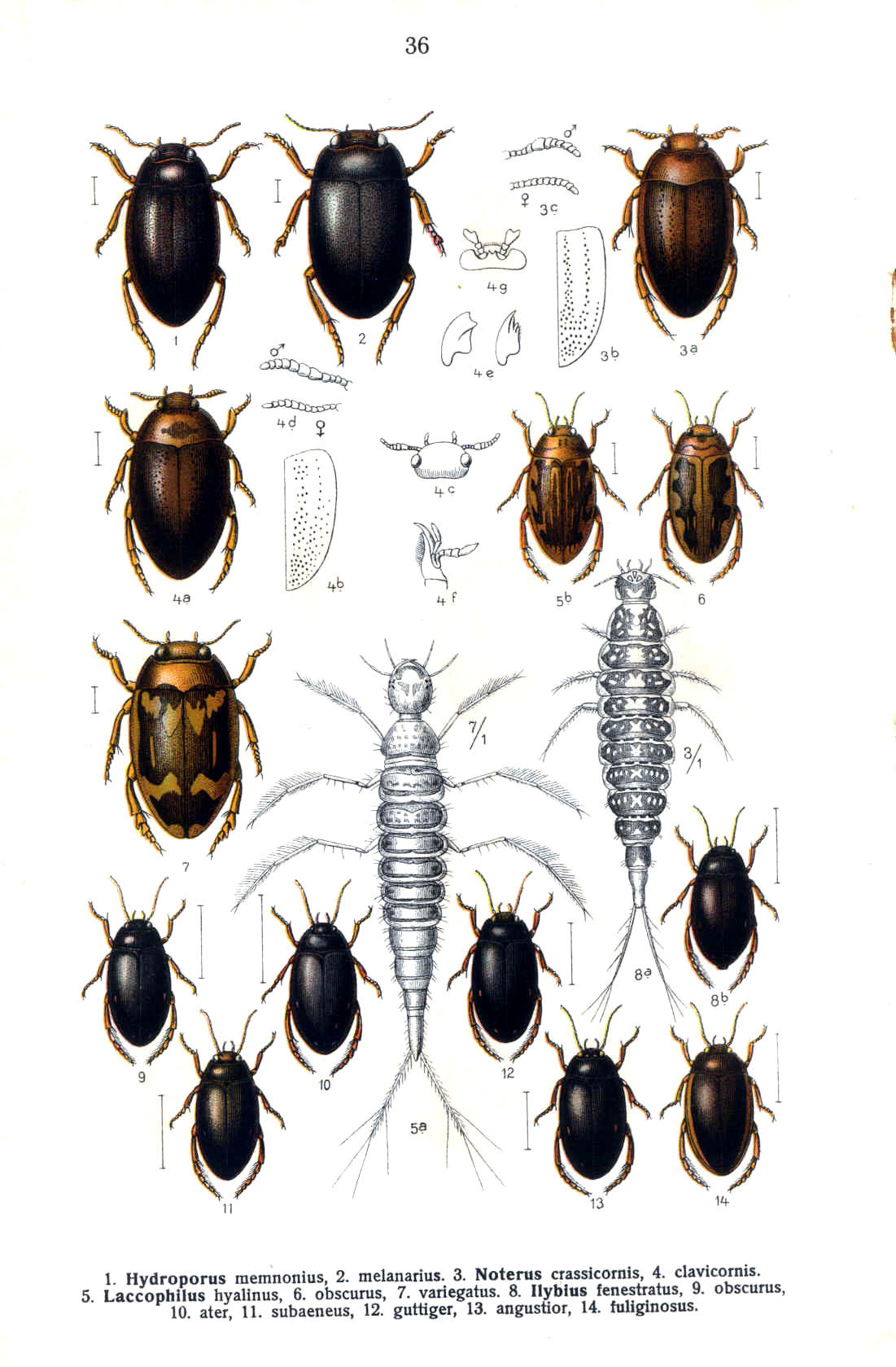
- Noterus crassicornis

Scientific classification
- Domain: Eukaryota
- Kingdom: Animalia
- Phylum: Arthropoda
- Class: Insecta
- Order: Coleoptera
- Suborder: Adephaga
- Family: Noteridae
- Genus: Noterus
- Species: N. crassicornis

Binomial name
- Noterus crassicornis (O.F.Müller, 1776)

= Noterus crassicornis =

Species of beetle

Noterus crassicornis is a species of beetle native to the Palearctic (including Europe) and the Near East. In Europe, it is only found in Austria, Belarus, Belgium, Bosnia and Herzegovina, Bulgaria, Croatia, Cyprus, the Czech Republic, mainland Denmark, Estonia, European Turkey, Finland, mainland France, Germany, Great Britain including the Isle of Man, Hungary, the Republic of Ireland, mainland Italy, Latvia, Lithuania, Luxembourg, Moldova, Northern Ireland, North Macedonia, mainland Norway, Poland, Russia, Sicily, Slovakia, Slovenia, Sweden, the Netherlands, Ukraine and Yugoslavia.
