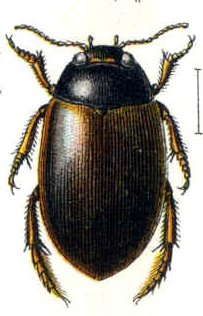

Scientific classification
- Kingdom: Animalia
- Phylum: Arthropoda
- Clade: Pancrustacea
- Class: Insecta
- Order: Coleoptera
- Suborder: Adephaga
- Family: Dytiscidae
- Genus: Agabus
- Subgenus: Acatodes
- Species: A. congener

Binomial name
- Agabus congener (Thunberg, 1794)

= Agabus congener =

Species of beetle

Agabus congener is a species of predatory beetle native to the Palearctic (including Europe) and the Near East. In Europe, it is only found in Andorra, Austria, Belarus, Belgium, Great Britain including Shetland, Orkney, Hebrides and Isle of Man, Bulgaria, Croatia, the Czech Republic, mainland Denmark, Estonia, Finland, mainland France, Germany, mainland Greece, the Republic of Ireland, mainland Italy, Kaliningrad, Latvia, Lithuania, Northern Ireland, North Macedonia, mainland Norway, Poland, Russia, Sardinia, Slovakia, mainland Spain, Sweden, Switzerland, the Netherlands and Ukraine.

Agabus congener can be found in small acidic ponds or mesotrophic fens. This species was identified in samples of organic sediment recovered along with mammoth bones which were excavated in Niederweningen, Switzerland. The presence of this and many other insect species indicates that the sediments formed in a reedy, acidic swamp with shallow mossy pools.

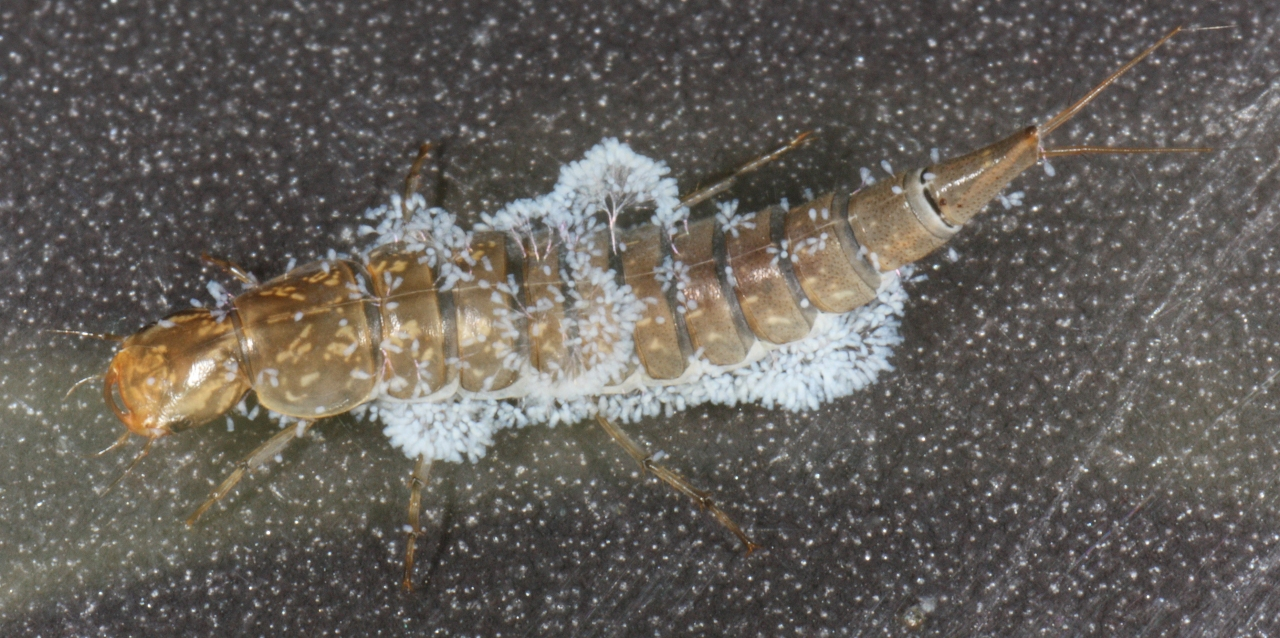
Larva attacked by fungus
