= Charles Nicholas Aubé =

French physician and entomologist

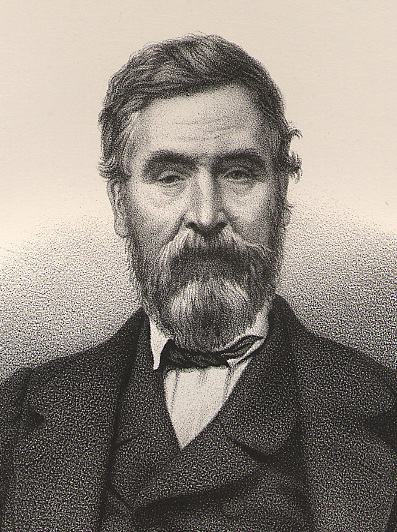
- Charles Nicholas Aubé
- Born: 6 May 1802; Paris
- Died: 15 October 1869 (aged 67)
- Education: School of Pharmacy, Paris
- Occupations: Physician, Entomologist
- Organization: Société Entomologique de France
- Known for: Work on Coleoptera

Charles Nicholas Aubé (6 May 1802 in Paris – 15 October 1869), was a French physician and entomologist.

Aubé studied at the school of pharmacy in Paris, joining in botanical sorties organised by its members and by the Museum. Gaining his diploma in 1824, he married a sister of Gustave Planche (1808-1857) in 1826. Commencing studies in medicine in 1829 he gained the title of Doctor in 1836 with a thesis on "la gale" (scabies). He was a founding member of the Société Entomologique de France of which he was "Dirigent" or director in 1842 and 1846. He worked on certain groups of Coleoptera for the publications of Pierre François Marie Auguste Dejean (1780–1845).

His collection is preserved by the Société Entomologique.

== Works ==
- Volume 6 of Spécies Général des Coléoptères, de la collection de M. le Comte Dejean (1838), titled Species général des hydrocanthares et gyriniens
- Pselaphiorum monographia cum synonymia extricata Magasin de zoologie de Guérin 1833 (Paris)
