= Milton Loch =

Lake in Dumfries and Galloway, Scotland

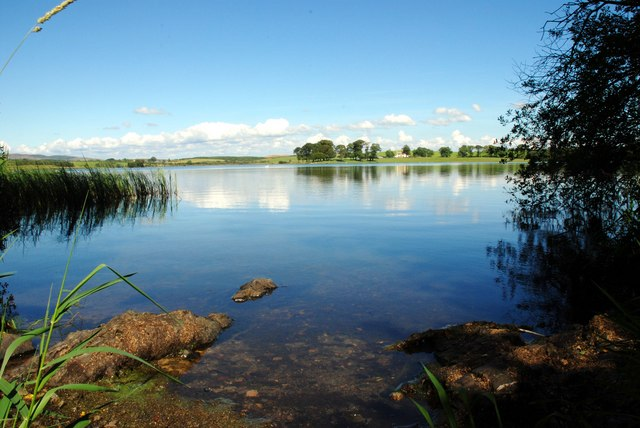

- Location within Scotland Location within the United Kingdom Location within Europe
- Location: Dumfries and Galloway, Scotland
- Coordinates: 55°01′30″N 03°48′54″W
- Type: Freshwater loch
- Part of: Urr Basin
- Primary outflows: Milton Burn
- Catchment area: 3.7 km^{2} (1.4 sq mi)
- Surface area: 0.58 km^{2} (0.22 sq mi)
- Average depth: 2 m (6 ft 7 in)
- Max. depth: 4.6 m (15 ft)
- Water volume: 1.16 km^{3} (0.28 cu mi)
- Shore length^{1}: 4 km (2.5 mi)
- Surface elevation: 128 m (420 ft)
- ^{1} Shore length is not a well-defined measure.

Milton Loch is an alkaline freshwater loch located in Dumfries and Galloway, Scotland. In the loch and nearby are archaeological sites including three crannogs.

== Location ==
Milton Loch is in the region of Dumfries and Galloway and more locally, the parish of Urr. It is part of the Urr Basin. Close locations include Milton, Crocketford and Dumfries.

== Biology ==
Milton Loch and its surroundings are popular birdwatching locations. They are home to many species of wildlife, including:

=== Plant life ===
- Alder
- Bottle Sedge
- Canadian Waterweed
- Common Duckweed
- Common Nettle
- Common Sallow
- Ivy-leaved Duckweed
- Lesser Pondweed
- Marsh Horsetail
- Marsh-marigold
- Meadowsweet
- Perfoliate Pondweed
- Purple-loosestrife
- Reed Canary-grass
- Chara aspera
- Chara globularis
- Shoreweed
- Water Horsetail
- Water Mint

=== Animal life ===
- Agabus bipustulatus
- Blethisa multipunctata
- Donacia vulgaris
- Gyrinus marinus
- Gyrinus substriatus
- Haliplus flavicollis
- Haliplus immaculatus
- Hygrotus inaequalis
- Hygrotus quinquelineatus
- Hyphydrus ovatus
- Ilybius ater
- Ilybius fenestratus
- Laccophilus minutus
- Nebrioporus assimilis
- Noterus clavicornis
- Rhantus exsoletus
- Common Quail
- Black Redstart
- Ring-necked Duck
- Smew
- Waxwing
- Greater Scaup
- Lesser Scaup
- Whooper Swan

=== Other ===
- Blue-green algae – blooms were discovered in 2018. Following this, Dumfries and Galloway council issued a warning about the toxic nature of the algae.

== Archaeological sites ==
=== Guido's excavations ===
In 1953, two separate crannogs were discovered in the loch after the water level was lowered. They were both excavated in 1955 by Peggy Guido (named C M Piggott in the excavation reports due to her marriage to Stuart Piggott).

The first of the two sites, "Milton Loch 1", is located in the northwest section of the loch. Excavations began in the autumn. Guido dated it to the 2nd century AD but after radiocarbon dating it was found be from the 5th century BC (Iron Age). The crannog is made largely of timber, including timber flooring. However, the materials were damaged by microorganisms in the loch. The foundations of the crannog remain, in the form of a "small stone covered island". Artifacts retrieved from the site include a fish-club, plough-head, bronze dress-fastener, mallet-head and two slotted planks; some of the artifacts are in the care of Dumfries Museum.

The second of the two sites, "Milton Loch 2", is located in the southeast section of the loch. Guido discovered it due to some timbers exposed above the water level. She noted many oak piles protruding upwards. Further investigations found only one oak pile at the site, although they acknowledged they may have been underneath the collected silt at the site. A 1989 investigation dated the site to the early 2nd century AD. In 2003 it was noted that algal blooms and worms had destroyed much of the timbers.

In 1953 as well, Guido excavated a site on Green Island, a small peninsula on the loch. Originally surveyed by the Royal Commission on the Ancient and Historical Monuments of Scotland (RCAHMS) in 1914, Guido considered it to be a fort of either the Dark Ages or medieval periods; Mr A E Truckell of Dumfries Museum originally thought it as Viking in his 1963 survey but later concurred with Guido. Later surveys found the site to be of an atypical design for forts of the time.

=== Other sites ===
In 1930, J McCargo of Kirkpatrick Durham found a flint arrowhead in the vicinity of the loch. He donated it to the National Museum of Antiquities of Scotland.

In 1989, another crannog was discovered in the loch by T N Dixon of St. Andrew's University. The "Milton Loch 3" site was discovered after investigation of a supposed island in the middle of the loch was surveyed. The crannog was built on the bedrock of the lake with some timbers being exposed. Like the other two crannogs, the timbers had been degraded by microorganisms. Using carbon dating, the site was dated to the late 5th century AD. Dixon also noted another site on the same outcrop, named "Milton Loch 4". Suspected again to be a crannog, it turned out to be an island in the loch.
