= Hyphoporus pugnator =

Scientific classification
- Kingdom: Animalia
- Phylum: Arthropoda
- Class: Insecta
- Order: Coleoptera
- Suborder: Adephaga
- Family: Dytiscidae
- Genus: Hyphoporus
- Species: H. pugnator

Binomial name
- Hyphoporus pugnator Sharp, 1890

Species of beetle

Hyphoporus pugnator, is a species of predaceous diving beetle found in India and Sri Lanka. The species is sometimes placed in the genus Hygrotus by some authors.
