= Hyphoporus nilghiricus =

Scientific classification
- Kingdom: Animalia
- Phylum: Arthropoda
- Class: Insecta
- Order: Coleoptera
- Suborder: Adephaga
- Family: Dytiscidae
- Genus: Hyphoporus
- Species: H. nilghiricus

Binomial name
- Hyphoporus nilghiricus Régimbart, 1903

Synonyms
- Hydroporus interpulsus Walker, 1858

Species of beetle

Hyphoporus nilghiricus, is a species of predaceous diving beetle found in India, Pakistan, and Sri Lanka. Sometimes, the species is included into the genus Hygrotus by some authors.
