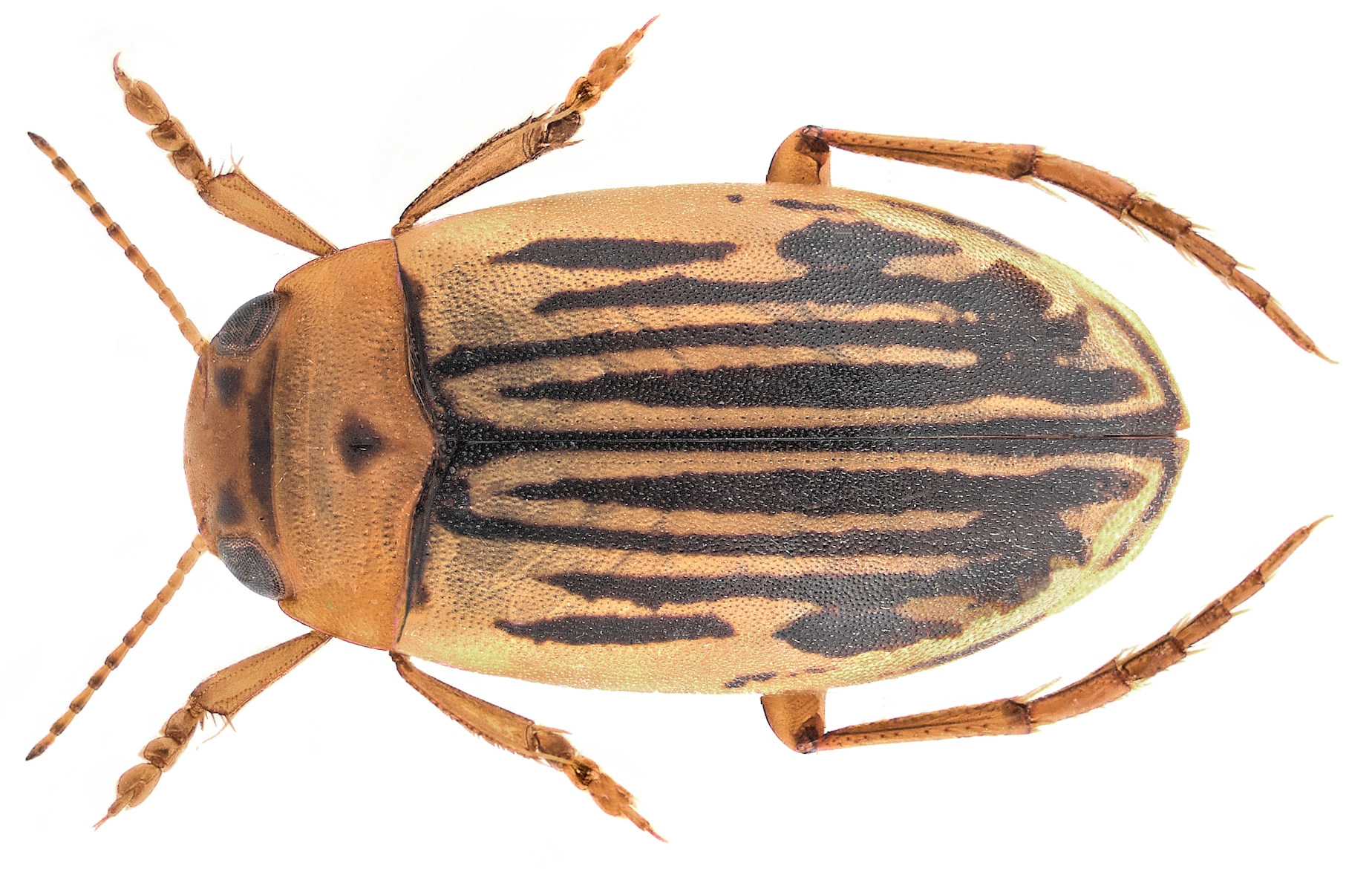

Scientific classification
- Kingdom: Animalia
- Phylum: Arthropoda
- Class: Insecta
- Order: Coleoptera
- Suborder: Adephaga
- Family: Dytiscidae
- Genus: Hygrotus
- Species: H. parallelogrammus

Binomial name
- Hygrotus parallelogrammus (Ahrens, 1812)

= Hygrotus parallellogrammus =

Species of beetle

Hygrotus parallelogrammus is a species of Dytiscidae native to Europe.
