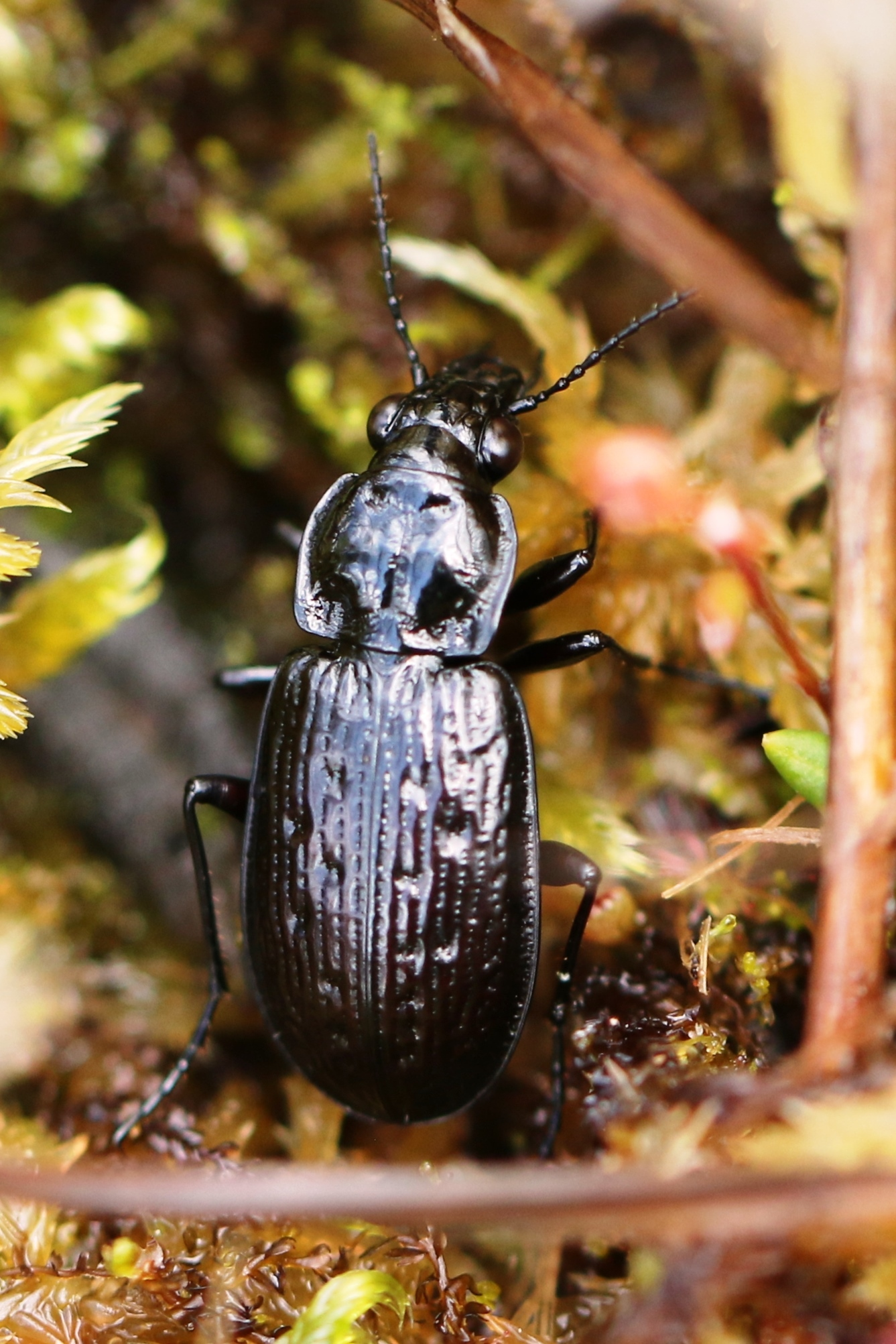
- Blethisa, Canada

Scientific classification
- Domain: Eukaryota
- Kingdom: Animalia
- Phylum: Arthropoda
- Class: Insecta
- Order: Coleoptera
- Suborder: Adephaga
- Family: Carabidae
- Tribe: Elaphrini
- Genus: Blethisa; Bonelli, 1810

= Blethisa =

Genus of ground beetle

Blethisa is a genus in the beetle family Carabidae. There are about nine described species in Blethisa, found in the Holarctic.

== Species ==
These nine species belong to the genus Blethisa:

- Blethisa catenaria Brown, 1944
- Blethisa eschscholtzii Zoubkoff, 1829
- Blethisa hudsonica Casey, 1924
- Blethisa julii LeConte, 1863
- Blethisa multipunctata (Linnaeus, 1758)
- Blethisa oregonensis LeConte, 1853
- Blethisa quadricollis Haldeman, 1847
- Blethisa tuberculata Motschulsky, 1844
- † Blethisa pleistocenica Lomnicki, 1894
