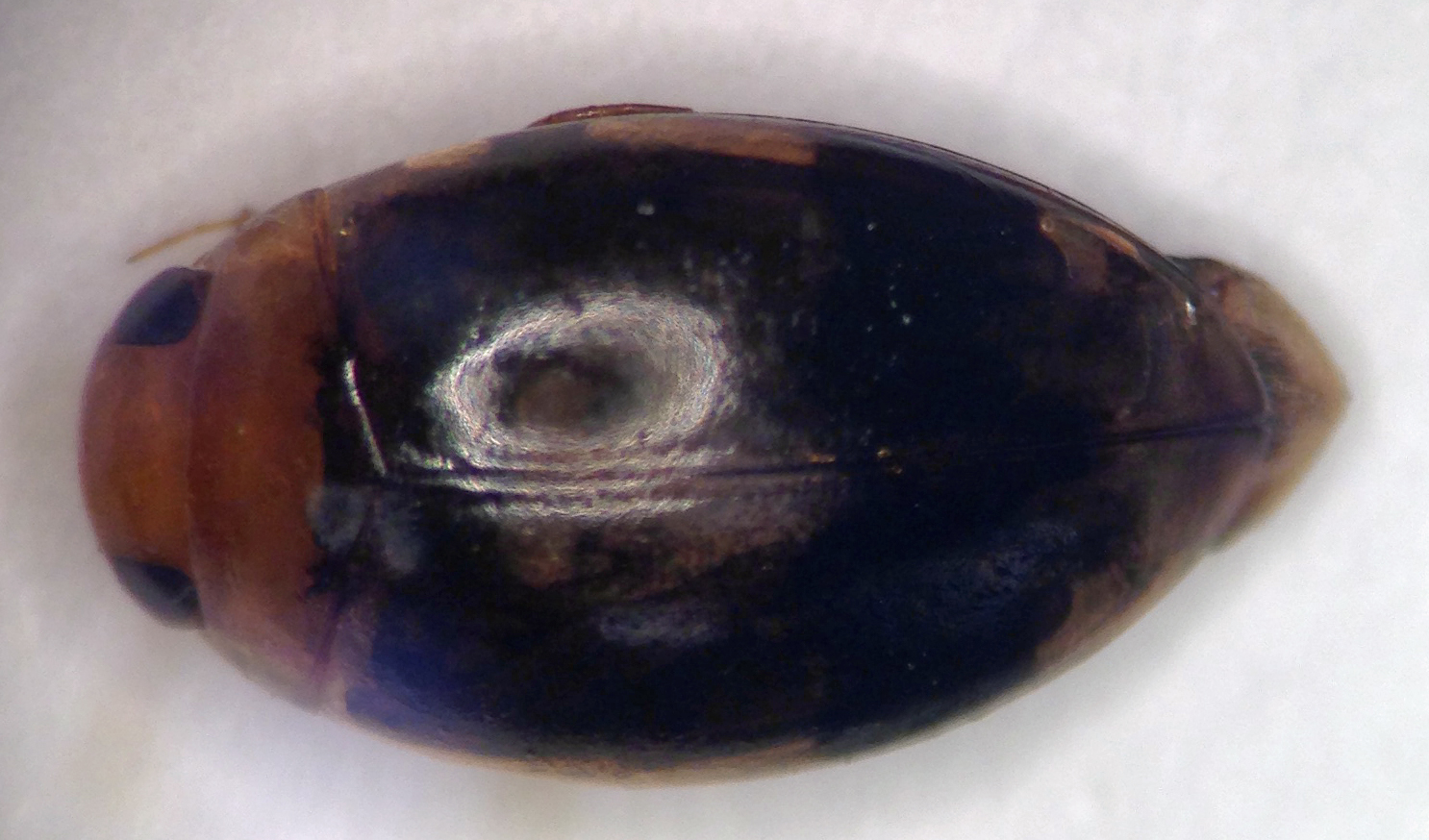

Scientific classification
- Kingdom: Animalia
- Phylum: Arthropoda
- Clade: Pancrustacea
- Class: Insecta
- Order: Coleoptera
- Suborder: Adephaga
- Family: Dytiscidae
- Genus: Laccophilus
- Species: L. fasciatus

Binomial name
- Laccophilus fasciatus Aubé, 1838

= Laccophilus fasciatus =

Species of beetle

Laccophilus fasciatus is a species of predaceous diving beetle in the family Dytiscidae. It is found in Central America and North America.

== Subspecies ==
- Laccophilus fasciatus fasciatus Aubé, 1838
- Laccophilus fasciatus rufus F. E. Melsheimer, 1844
- Laccophilus fasciatus terminalis Sharp, 1882
