= Blethisa oregonensis =

Scientific classification
- Domain: Eukaryota
- Kingdom: Animalia
- Phylum: Arthropoda
- Class: Insecta
- Order: Coleoptera
- Suborder: Adephaga
- Family: Carabidae
- Genus: Blethisa
- Species: B. oregonensis

Binomial name
- Blethisa oregonensis LeConte, 1853

Species of ground beetle

Blethisa oregonensis is a species of ground beetle in the family Carabidae. It is found in North America.
