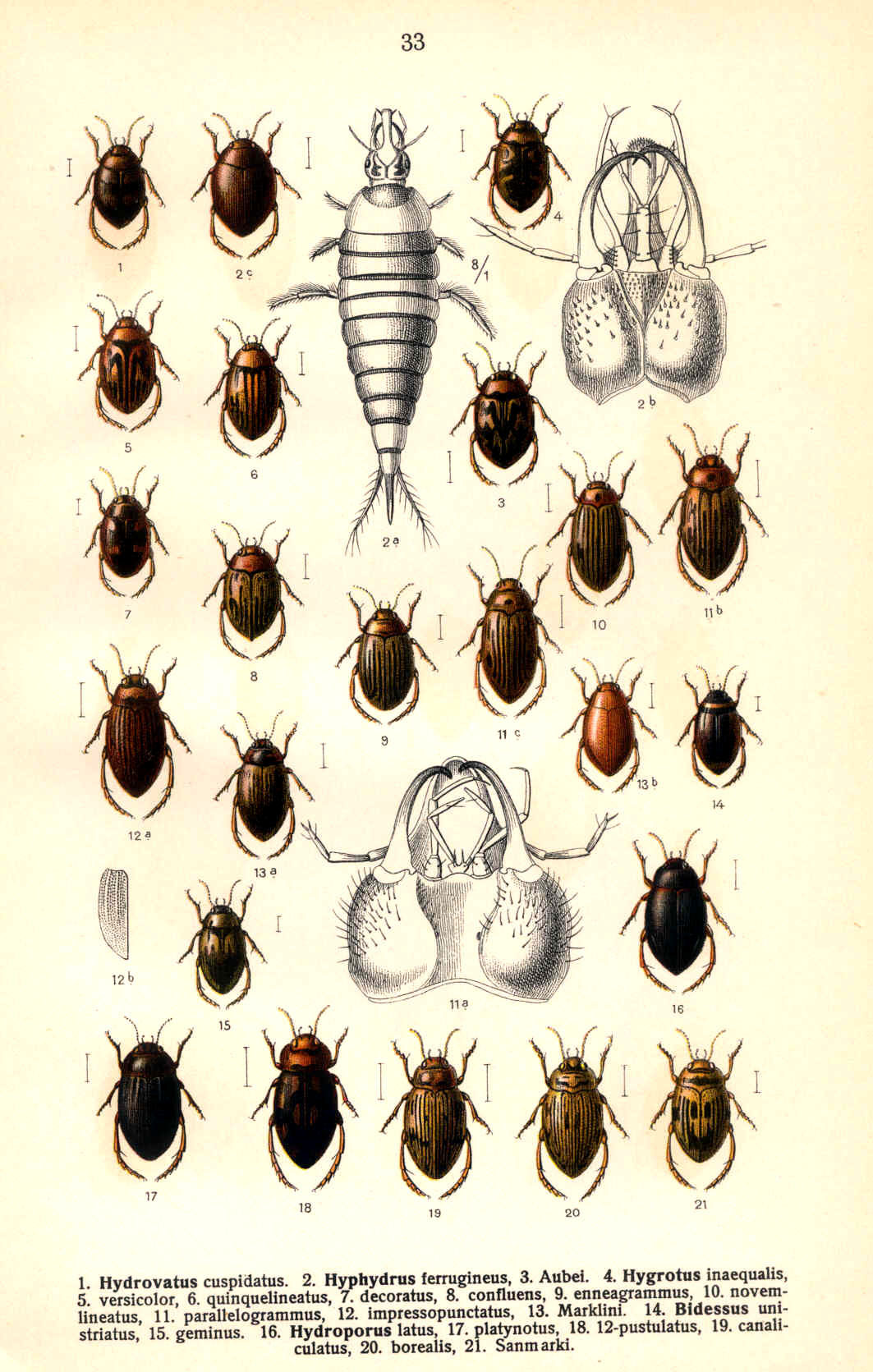

Scientific classification
- Domain: Eukaryota
- Kingdom: Animalia
- Phylum: Arthropoda
- Class: Insecta
- Order: Coleoptera
- Suborder: Adephaga
- Family: Dytiscidae
- Genus: Hygrotus
- Species: H. versicolor

Binomial name
- Hygrotus versicolor (Schaller, 1783)

= Hygrotus versicolor =

Species of beetle

Hygrotus versicolor is a species of Dytiscidae native to Europe.
