= Laccophilus oscillator =

Scientific classification
- Kingdom: Animalia
- Phylum: Arthropoda
- Clade: Pancrustacea
- Class: Insecta
- Order: Coleoptera
- Suborder: Adephaga
- Family: Dytiscidae
- Genus: Laccophilus
- Species: L. oscillator

Binomial name
- Laccophilus oscillator Sharp, 1882

Species of beetle

Laccophilus oscillator is a species of predaceous diving beetle in the family Dytiscidae. It is found in North America and the Neotropics.

== Subspecies ==
These two subspecies belong to the species Laccophilus oscillator:

- Laccophilus oscillator laevipennis Sharp, 1882
- Laccophilus oscillator oscillator Sharp, 1882
