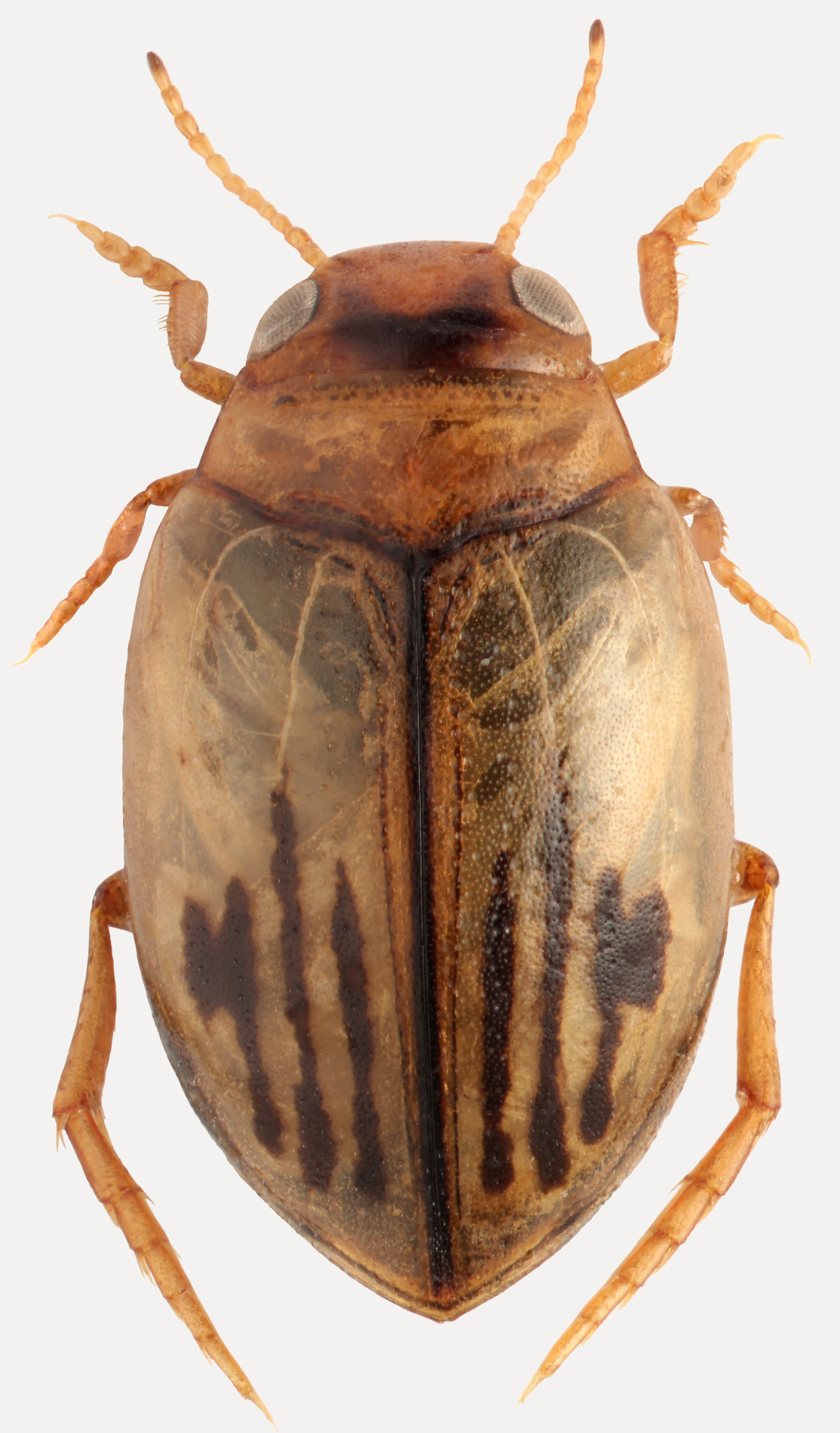

Scientific classification
- Kingdom: Animalia
- Phylum: Arthropoda
- Class: Insecta
- Order: Coleoptera
- Suborder: Adephaga
- Family: Dytiscidae
- Genus: Hygrotus
- Species: H. confluens

Binomial name
- Hygrotus confluens (Fabricius, 1787)

= Hygrotus confluens =

Species of beetle

Hygrotus confluens is a species of Dytiscidae native to Europe.
