= Laccophilus uniformis =

Scientific classification
- Kingdom: Animalia
- Phylum: Arthropoda
- Clade: Pancrustacea
- Class: Insecta
- Order: Coleoptera
- Suborder: Adephaga
- Family: Dytiscidae
- Subfamily: Laccophilinae
- Genus: Laccophilus
- Species: L. uniformis

Binomial name
- Laccophilus uniformis Motschulsky, 1859

Synonyms
- Laccophilus rufulus Régimbart, 1888; Laccophilus weyersi Régimbart, 1900

Species of beetle

Laccophilus uniformis, is a species of predaceous diving beetle found in India, Andaman & Nicobar Islands, Bangladesh, Myanmar, Sri Lanka, Cambodia, China, Indonesia, Laos, Thailand, and Vietnam.
