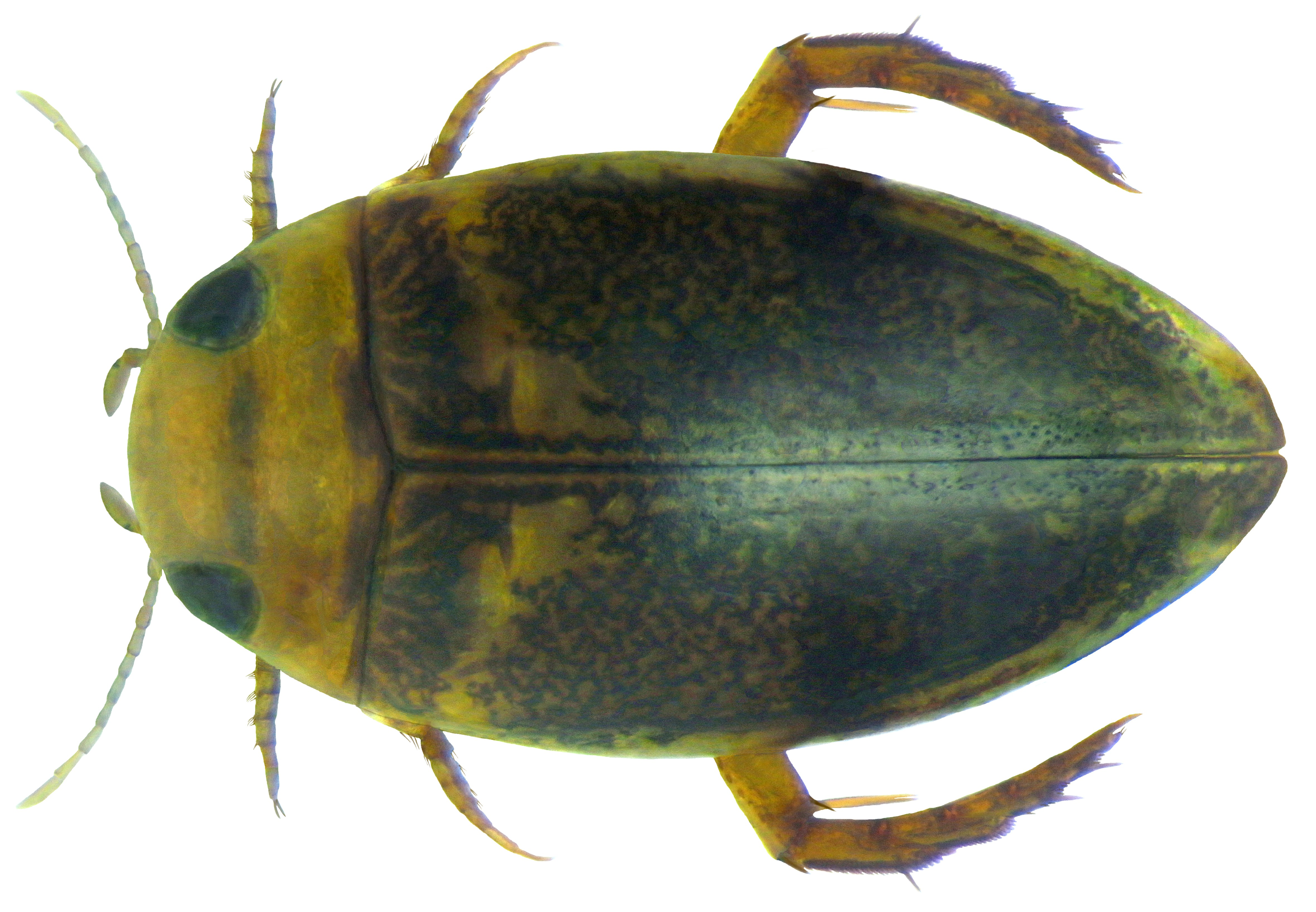

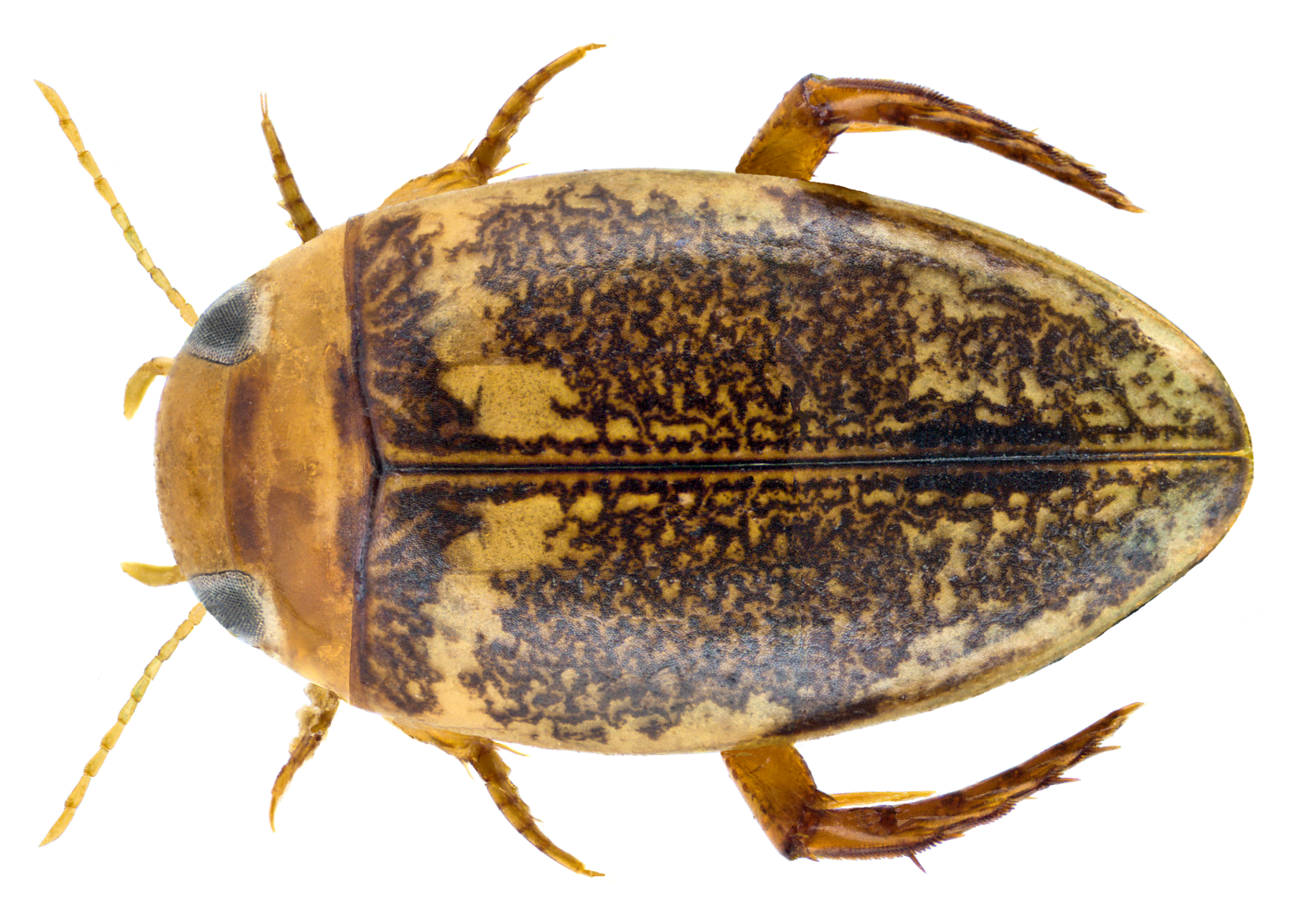

Scientific classification
- Kingdom: Animalia
- Phylum: Arthropoda
- Clade: Pancrustacea
- Class: Insecta
- Order: Coleoptera
- Suborder: Adephaga
- Family: Dytiscidae
- Genus: Laccophilus
- Species: L. inefficiens

Binomial name
- Laccophilus inefficiens (Walker, 1859)

Synonyms
- Laccophilus chinensis Boheman, 1858; Hydroporus inefficiens Walker, 1859

= Laccophilus inefficiens =

Species of beetle

Laccophilus inefficiens, is a species of predaceous diving beetle found in India, Bangladesh, Bhutan, Myanmar, Nepal, Pakistan, Sri Lanka, China, Hong Kong, Japan, Taiwan, Vietnam, Laos, Thailand, Indonesia, Iran and Malaysia.

== Description ==
This elongated oval species has a body length of 3.43 mm. Body with pale testaceous elytra with reduced brownish coloration. Thread like antennae with 11 segmented which are uniformly yellowish brown in color. Eyes continuous with outline of head, and testaceous with indistinct darker spots. Pronotum also testaceous, but scutellum is not visible clearly. In elytra, there is a sub basal transverse sinuous band. Apex of each elytron without yellowish rounded patches. Elytra with undulating single or double lines, sometimes single lines reduced to irritation of small, then curved lines.
