= Laccophilus mexicanus =

Scientific classification
- Kingdom: Animalia
- Phylum: Arthropoda
- Clade: Pancrustacea
- Class: Insecta
- Order: Coleoptera
- Suborder: Adephaga
- Family: Dytiscidae
- Genus: Laccophilus
- Species: L. mexicanus

Binomial name
- Laccophilus mexicanus Aubé, 1838

Species of beetle

Laccophilus mexicanus is a species of predaceous diving beetle in the family Dytiscidae. It is found in North America and the Neotropics.

== Subspecies ==
These three subspecies belong to the species Laccophilus mexicanus:

- Laccophilus mexicanus atristernalis Crotch, 1873
- Laccophilus mexicanus mexicanus Aubé, 1838
- Laccophilus mexicanus oaxacensis Zimmerman, 1970
