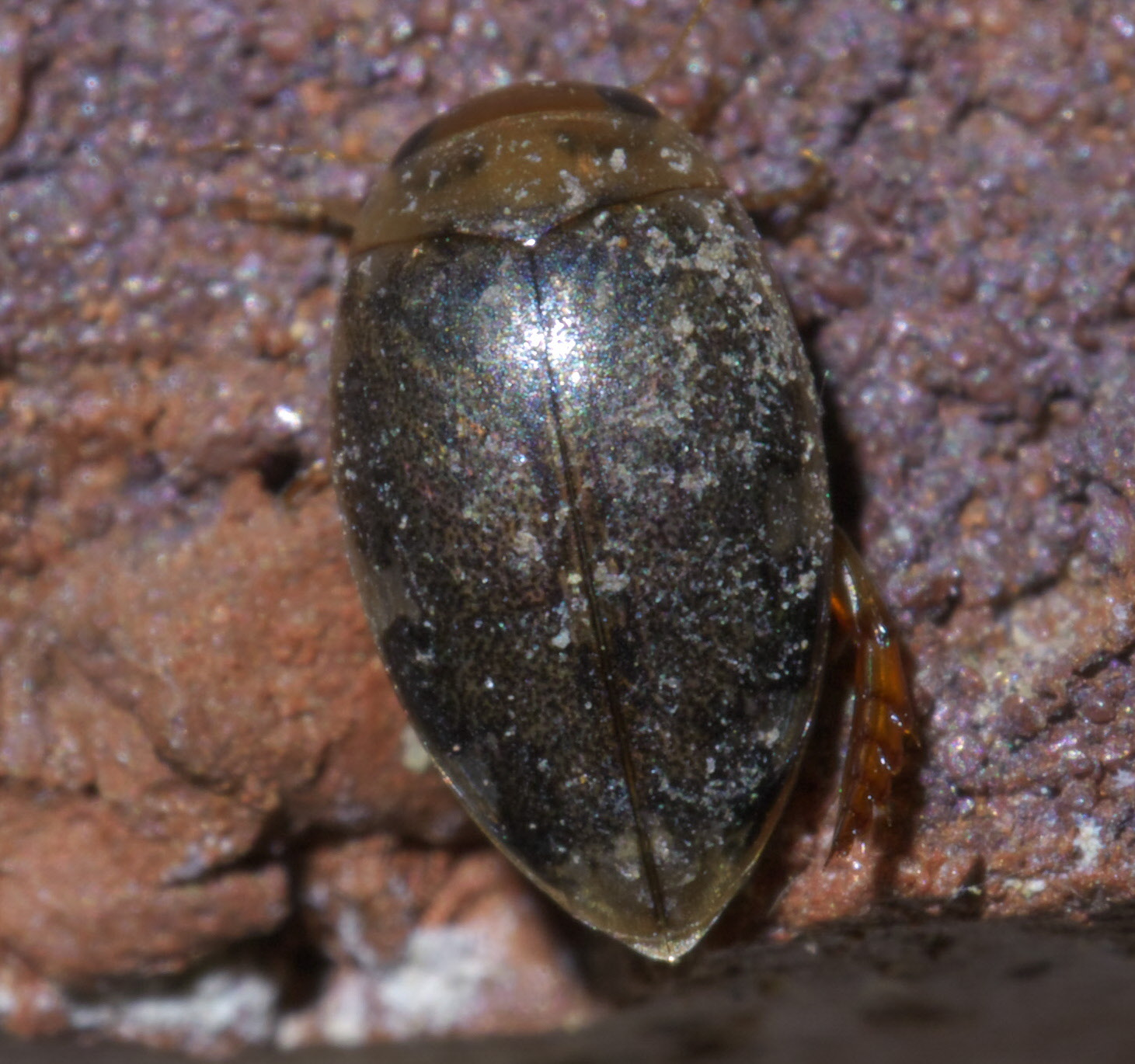

Scientific classification
- Kingdom: Animalia
- Phylum: Arthropoda
- Clade: Pancrustacea
- Class: Insecta
- Order: Coleoptera
- Suborder: Adephaga
- Family: Dytiscidae
- Genus: Laccophilus
- Species: L. proximus

Binomial name
- Laccophilus proximus Say, 1823

= Laccophilus proximus =

Species of beetle

Laccophilus proximus is a species of predaceous diving beetle in the family Dytiscidae. It is found in North America and the Neotropics.

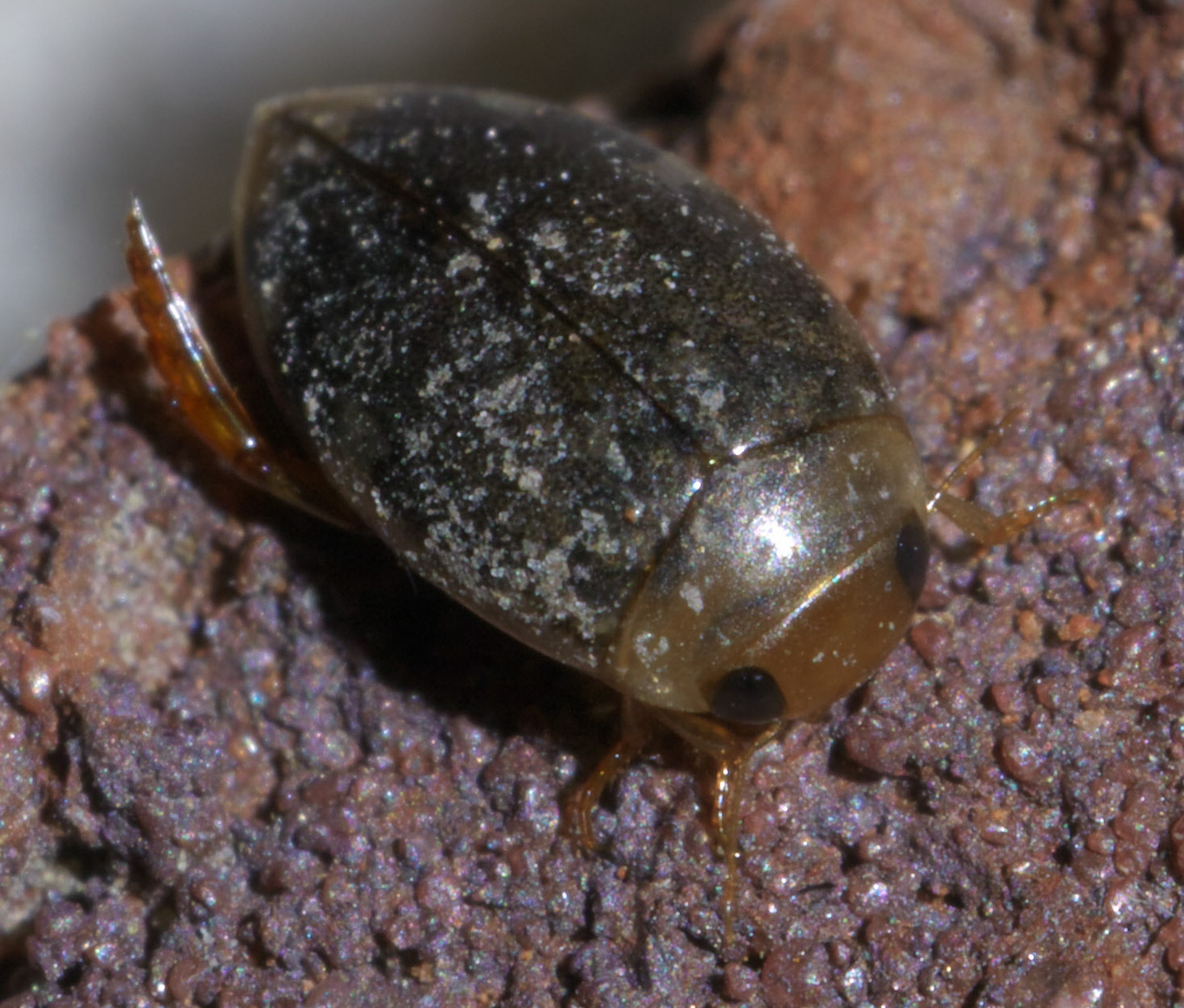
