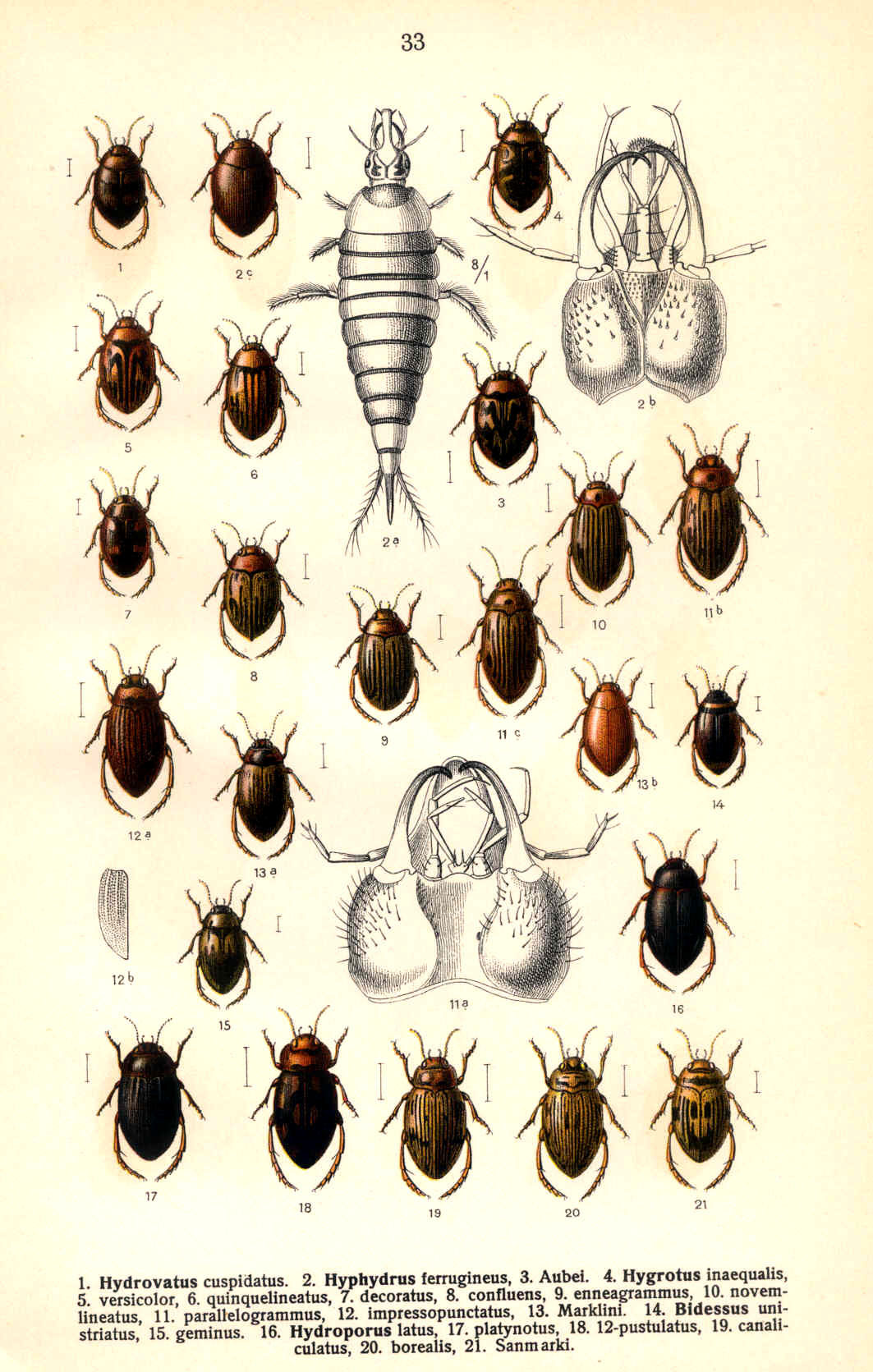

Scientific classification
- Domain: Eukaryota
- Kingdom: Animalia
- Phylum: Arthropoda
- Class: Insecta
- Order: Coleoptera
- Suborder: Adephaga
- Family: Dytiscidae
- Genus: Hygrotus
- Species: H. novemlineatus

Binomial name
- Hygrotus novemlineatus (Stephens, 1829)

= Hygrotus novemlineatus =

Species of beetle

Hygrotus novemlineatus is a species of Dytiscidae native to Europe.
