= Blethisa catenaria =

Scientific classification
- Domain: Eukaryota
- Kingdom: Animalia
- Phylum: Arthropoda
- Class: Insecta
- Order: Coleoptera
- Suborder: Adephaga
- Family: Carabidae
- Genus: Blethisa
- Species: B. catenaria

Binomial name
- Blethisa catenaria Brown, 1944

Species of ground beetle

Blethisa catenaria is a species of ground beetle in the family Carabidae. It is found in Europe and Northern Asia (excluding China) and North America.
