= Laccophilus anticatus =

Scientific classification
- Kingdom: Animalia
- Phylum: Arthropoda
- Clade: Pancrustacea
- Class: Insecta
- Order: Coleoptera
- Suborder: Adephaga
- Family: Dytiscidae
- Genus: Laccophilus
- Species: L. anticatus

Binomial name
- Laccophilus anticatus Sharp, 1890

Synonyms
- Laccophilus wewalki Vazirani, 1975; Laccophilus wewalkai Nilsson, 1999; Laccophilus antecatus Sharp, 1890; Laccophilus translucidus Régimbart, 1899; Laccophilus pellucidus Régimbart, 1888

Species of beetle

Laccophilus anticatus, is a species of predaceous diving beetle found in South and South East Asia.

== Subspecies ==
Two subspecies have been identified.

- Laccophilus anticatus anticatus Sharp, 1890 - India, Bangladesh, Pakistan, Sri Lanka, Indonesia
- Laccophilus anticatus translucidus Régimbart, 1899 - Myanmar

The subspecies anticatus is a small glabrous beetle with a length of about 3 to 4 mm. Body dorsally subflattened with yellow and blackish patches.

== Biology ==
They inhabited in marshy areas, shallow bodies of water rich in vegetation and small fauna as well as dense growth of filamentous alga, Spirogyra. Adults are active and spend most of their time submerged. beetles They are semigregarious and are found in societies. Abundance of the adults increased rapidly during the monsoon and post monsoon hot seasons where they are frequently found in temporary pools and weed infested ponds. Adult beetles can be used in biological control of mosquitoes.
