= Hyphoporus =

Scientific classification
- Kingdom: Animalia
- Phylum: Arthropoda
- Class: Insecta
- Order: Coleoptera
- Suborder: Adephaga
- Family: Dytiscidae
- Genus: Hyphoporus; Sharp, 1882

Genus of beetles

Hyphoporus is a genus of beetles in the family Dytiscidae, containing the following species:

- Hyphoporus anitae Vazirani, 1969
- Hyphoporus aper Sharp, 1882
- Hyphoporus bengalensis Severin, 1890
- Hyphoporus bertrandi Vazirani, 1969
- Hyphoporus caliginosus Régimbart, 1899
- Hyphoporus dehraduni Vazirani, 1969
- Hyphoporus elevatus Sharp, 1882
- Hyphoporus geetae Vazirani, 1969
- Hyphoporus interpulsus (Walker, 1858)
- Hyphoporus josephi Vazirani, 1969
- Hyphoporus kempi Gschwendtner, 1936
- Hyphoporus montanus Régimbart, 1899
- Hyphoporus nilghiricus Régimbart, 1903
- Hyphoporus pacistanus Guignot, 1959
- Hyphoporus pugnator Sharp, 1890
- Hyphoporus severini Régimbart, 1892
- Hyphoporus solieri (Aubé, 1838)
- Hyphoporus subaequalis Vazirani, 1969
- Hyphoporus tonkinensis Régimbart, 1899
