= Laccophilus vacaensis =

Scientific classification
- Kingdom: Animalia
- Phylum: Arthropoda
- Clade: Pancrustacea
- Class: Insecta
- Order: Coleoptera
- Suborder: Adephaga
- Family: Dytiscidae
- Genus: Laccophilus
- Species: L. vacaensis

Binomial name
- Laccophilus vacaensis Young, 1953

Species of beetle

Laccophilus vacaensis is a species of predaceous diving beetle in the family Dytiscidae. It is found in North America and the Neotropics.

== Subspecies ==
These three subspecies belong to the species Laccophilus vacaensis:

- Laccophilus vacaensis chihuahuae Zimmerman, 1970
- Laccophilus vacaensis thermophilus Zimmerman, 1970
- Laccophilus vacaensis vacaensis Young, 1953
