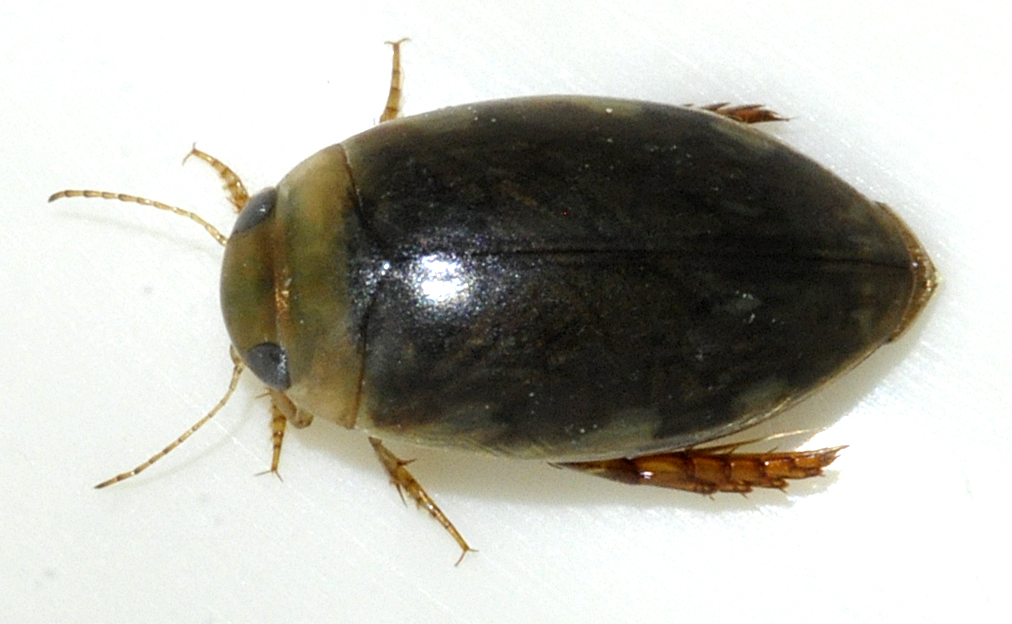
- Laccophilus minutus, Germany

Scientific classification
- Domain: Eukaryota
- Kingdom: Animalia
- Phylum: Arthropoda
- Class: Insecta
- Order: Coleoptera
- Suborder: Adephaga
- Family: Dytiscidae
- Subfamily: Laccophilinae
- Genus: Laccophilus; Leach, 1815

= Laccophilus =

Genus of beetles

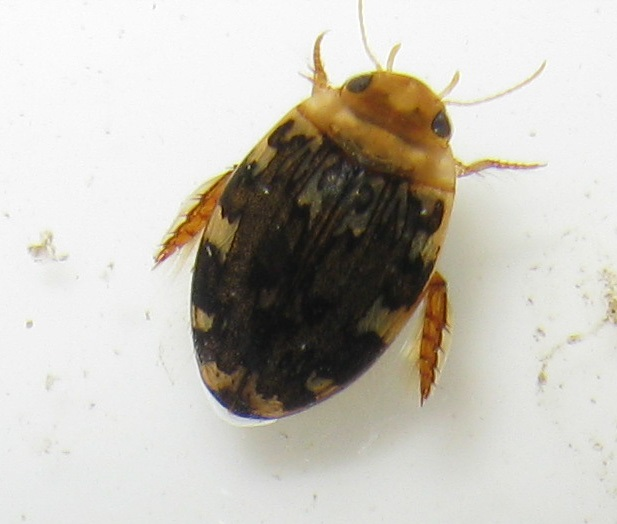
Laccophilus maculosus maculosus, Pennsylvania

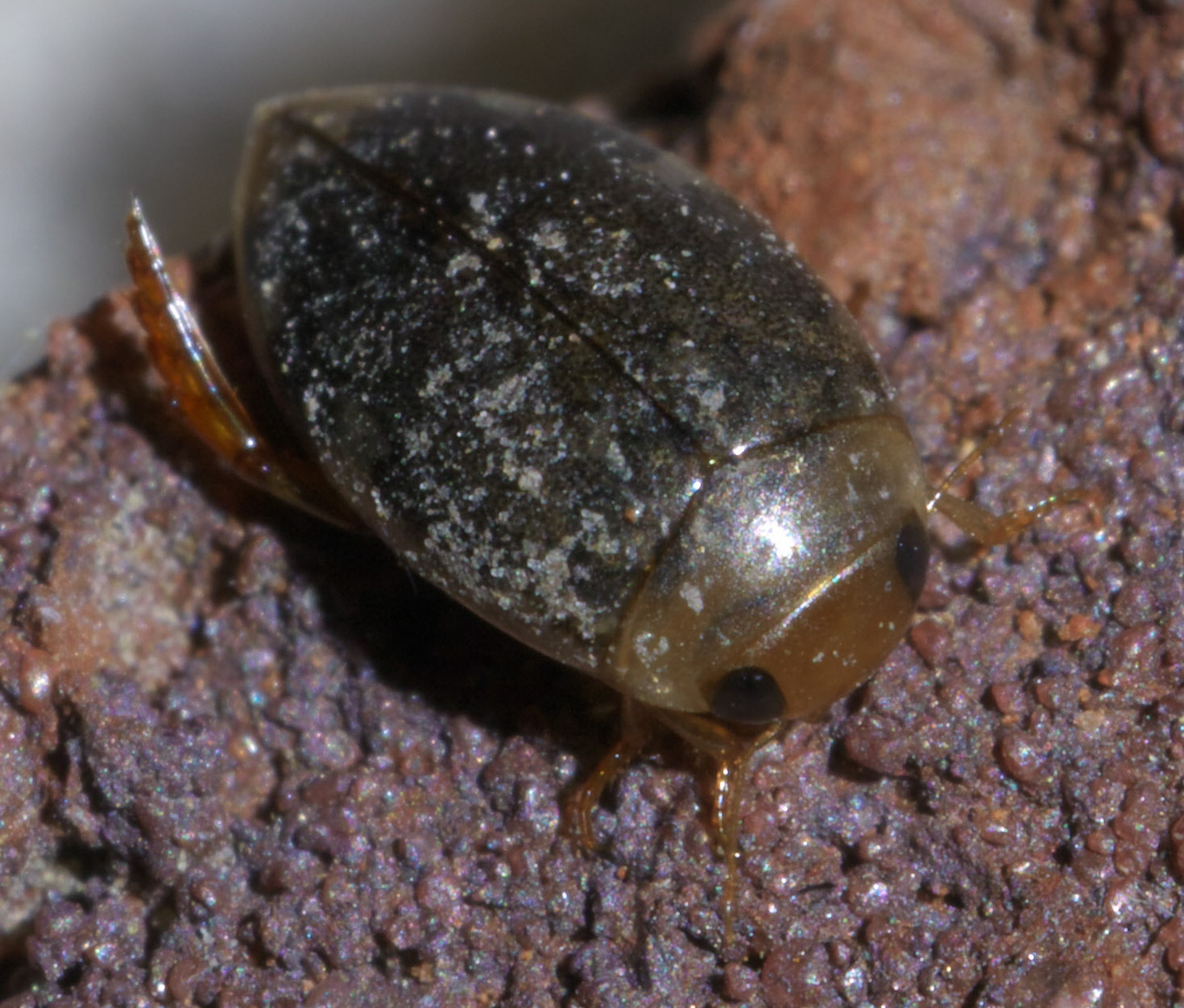
Laccophilus proximus, Oklahoma

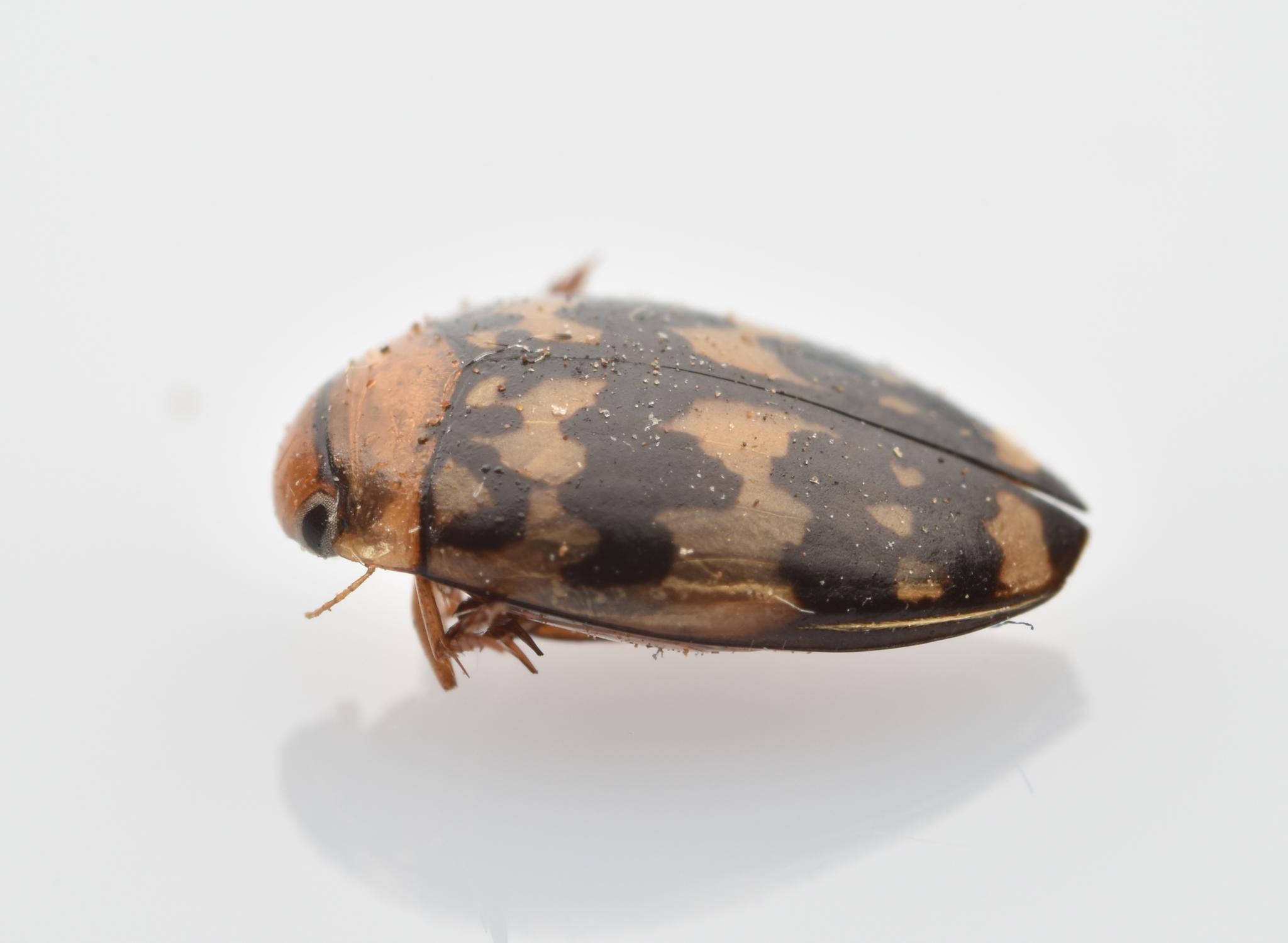
Laccophilus pictus, Texas

Laccophilus is a genus of water beetle found in nearly every temperate or tropical region in the world including but not limited to Europe, the Near East, the Nearctic, North Africa and the Oriental region. It contains the following species:

These species belong to the genus Laccophilus

- Laccophilus addendus Sharp, 1882
- Laccophilus adjutor Guignot, 1950
- Laccophilus adspersus Boheman, 1848
- Laccophilus aemulus Guignot, 1955
- Laccophilus aequatorius Peschet, 1923
- Laccophilus agilis Sharp, 1887
- Laccophilus alariei Megna, Deler-Hernández & Challet, 2011
- Laccophilus alluaudi Régimbart, 1900
- Laccophilus amicus Guignot, 1955
- Laccophilus amoenus Régimbart, 1889
- Laccophilus angustus Régimbart, 1889
- Laccophilus anticatus Sharp, 1890
- Laccophilus aurofasciatus Vazirani, 1972
- Laccophilus auropictus Régimbart, 1899
- Laccophilus australis Biström, Nilsson & Bergsten, 2015
- Laccophilus bacchusi Brancucci, 1983
- Laccophilus badeni Sharp, 1882
- Laccophilus balzani Régimbart, 1889
- Laccophilus bapak Balke, Larson & Hendrich, 1997
- Laccophilus baturitiensis Hendrich & Balke, 1995
- Laccophilus bellus Biström, Nilsson & Bergsten, 2015
- Laccophilus benoiti Guignot, 1953
- Laccophilus bergsteni Manuel & Ramahandrison, 2020
- Laccophilus beroni Rocchi, 1986
- Laccophilus biai Bilardo & Rocchi, 1990
- Laccophilus bicolor Laporte, 1835
- Laccophilus bifasciatus Chevrolat, 1863
- Laccophilus biguttatus Kirby, 1837
- Laccophilus bilardoi Pederzani & Rocchi, 1982
- Laccophilus bilix Guignot, 1952
- Laccophilus bizonatus Régimbart, 1895
- Laccophilus boukali Hájek & Stastný, 2005
- Laccophilus brancuccii Biström, Nilsson & Bergsten, 2015
- Laccophilus brasiliensis Régimbart, 1889
- Laccophilus brownei Guignot, 1947
- Laccophilus burgeoni Gschwendtner, 1930
- Laccophilus caiaricus Guignot, 1956
- Laccophilus calvus Guignot, 1955
- Laccophilus canthydroides Omer-Cooper, 1957
- Laccophilus carbonelli Guignot, 1957
- Laccophilus cayennensis Aubé, 1838
- Laccophilus ceylonicus Zimmermann, 1919
- Laccophilus chelinus Guignot, 1955
- Laccophilus chilensis Sharp, 1882
- Laccophilus chinensis Boheman, 1858
- Laccophilus chini Balke, Mazzoldi & Hendrich, 1998
- Laccophilus cianferonii Bilardo & Rocchi, 2019
- Laccophilus cingulatus Sharp, 1882
- Laccophilus clarki Sharp, 1882
- Laccophilus comes Guignot, 1955
- Laccophilus complicatus Sharp, 1882
- Laccophilus concettae Pederzani, 1983
- Laccophilus conjunctus Guignot, 1950
- Laccophilus continentalis Gschwendtner, 1935
- Laccophilus contiro Guignot, 1952
- Laccophilus corystes Zhang, 1989
- Laccophilus cryptos Biström, Nilsson & Bergsten, 2015
- Laccophilus curvifasciatus Guignot, 1952
- Laccophilus cyclopis Sharp, 1882
- Laccophilus deceptor Guignot, 1953
- Laccophilus decoratus Boheman, 1858
- Laccophilus decorosus Biström, Nilsson & Bergsten, 2015
- Laccophilus demoflysi Normand, 1938
- Laccophilus desintegratus Régimbart, 1895
- Laccophilus difficilis Sharp, 1873
- Laccophilus dikinohaseus Kamite, Hikida & Satô, 2005
- Laccophilus dreheri Guignot, 1952
- Laccophilus duplex Sharp, 1882
- Laccophilus eboris Biström, Nilsson & Bergsten, 2015
- Laccophilus ekari Balke, Larson & Hendrich, 1997
- Laccophilus elegans Sharp, 1882
- Laccophilus ellipticus Régimbart, 1889
- Laccophilus empheres Biström, Nilsson & Bergsten, 2015
- Laccophilus enigmaticus Biström, Nilsson & Bergsten, 2015
- Laccophilus epibletus Guignot, 1955
- Laccophilus epinephes Guignot, 1955
- Laccophilus epipleuricus Zimmermann, 1921
- Laccophilus fasciatus Aubé, 1838
- Laccophilus ferrugo Biström, Nilsson & Bergsten, 2015
- Laccophilus filicornis Sharp, 1887
- Laccophilus flaveolus Régimbart, 1906
- Laccophilus flaviventris Régimbart, 1904
- Laccophilus flavopictus Régimbart, 1889
- Laccophilus flavoscriptus Régimbart, 1895
- Laccophilus flexuosus Aubé, 1838
- Laccophilus flores Hendrich & Balke, 1998
- Laccophilus fractus Sharp, 1882
- Laccophilus fragilis Sharp, 1887
- Laccophilus freudei Guignot, 1957
- Laccophilus fumatus Sharp, 1882
- Laccophilus furthi Biström, Nilsson & Bergsten, 2015
- Laccophilus fuscipennis Sharp, 1882
- Laccophilus garambanus Guignot, 1958
- Laccophilus gentilis LeConte, 1863
- Laccophilus girardi Brancucci, 1983
- Laccophilus gounellei Régimbart, 1903
- Laccophilus grammicus Sharp, 1882
- Laccophilus grammopterus Zimmermann, 1925
- Laccophilus grossus Biström, Nilsson & Bergsten, 2015
- Laccophilus guentheri Biström, Nilsson & Bergsten, 2015
- Laccophilus guignoti Legros, 1954
- Laccophilus guineensis Biström, Nilsson & Bergsten, 2015
- Laccophilus guttalis Régimbart, 1893
- Laccophilus hebusuensis Watanabe & Kamite, 2020
- Laccophilus heidiae Brancucci, 1983
- Laccophilus hendrichi Hájek & Brancucci, 2015
- Laccophilus horni Branden, 1885
- Laccophilus huastecus Zimmerman, 1970
- Laccophilus hyalinus (De Geer, 1774)
- Laccophilus immitis Guignot, 1952
- Laccophilus immundus Sharp, 1882
- Laccophilus inagua Young, 1963
- Laccophilus incomptus Biström, Nilsson & Bergsten, 2015
- Laccophilus inconstans Biström, Nilsson & Bergsten, 2015
- Laccophilus incrassatus Gschwendtner, 1933
- Laccophilus indicus Gschwendtner, 1936
- Laccophilus inefficiens (Walker, 1859)
- Laccophilus inobservatus Biström, Nilsson & Bergsten, 2015
- Laccophilus inornatus Zimmermann, 1926
- Laccophilus insularum Biström, Nilsson & Bergsten, 2015
- Laccophilus intermedius Régimbart, 1889
- Laccophilus irroratus Aubé, 1838
- Laccophilus isamberti Biström, Nilsson & Bergsten, 2015
- Laccophilus jaechi Hájek & Brancucci, 2015
- Laccophilus javanicus Régimbart, 1899
- Laccophilus kaensis Brancucci, 1983
- Laccophilus kalimantanensis Hájek & Brancucci, 2015
- Laccophilus kaszabi Brancucci, 1983
- Laccophilus kempi Gschwendtner, 1936
- Laccophilus kobensis Sharp, 1873
- Laccophilus komareki Hájek & Brancucci, 2015
- Laccophilus laeticulus Régimbart, 1895
- Laccophilus laetus Guignot, 1955
- Laccophilus lateralis Sharp, 1882
- Laccophilus latifrons Sharp, 1882
- Laccophilus latipennis Brancucci, 1983
- Laccophilus latipes Sharp, 1882
- Laccophilus leechi Zimmerman, 1970
- Laccophilus leguyaderi Manuel & Ramahandrison, 2020
- Laccophilus leonensis Régimbart, 1895
- Laccophilus lewisioides Brancucci, 1983
- Laccophilus lewisius Sharp, 1873
- Laccophilus lineatus Aubé, 1838
- Laccophilus livingstoni Omer-Cooper, 1958
- Laccophilus luctuosus Sharp, 1882
- Laccophilus luteosignatus Gschwendtner, 1943
- Laccophilus macronychus Guignot, 1957
- Laccophilus maculosus (Germar, 1823)
- Laccophilus mahakamensis Balke, Mazzoldi & Hendrich, 1998
- Laccophilus maindroni Régimbart, 1897
- Laccophilus makay Manuel & Ramahandrison, 2020
- Laccophilus mateui Omer-Cooper, 1970
- Laccophilus mathani Guignot, 1955
- Laccophilus mazzoldii Hájek & Brancucci, 2015
- Laccophilus medialis Sharp, 1882
- Laccophilus mediocris Guignot, 1952
- Laccophilus melas Guignot, 1958
- Laccophilus menieri Brancucci, 1983
- Laccophilus mexicanus Aubé, 1838
- Laccophilus minimus Biström, Nilsson & Bergsten, 2015
- Laccophilus minutus (Linnaeus, 1758)
- Laccophilus mirabilis Guignot, 1956
- Laccophilus mistecus Sharp, 1882
- Laccophilus modestus Régimbart, 1895
- Laccophilus morondavensis Guignot, 1957
- Laccophilus mutatus Omer-Cooper, 1970
- Laccophilus nakajimai Kamite, Hikida & Satô, 2005
- Laccophilus nastus Spangler, 1966
- Laccophilus necopinus Guignot, 1942
- Laccophilus newtoni Brancucci, 1983
- Laccophilus nigricans Sharp, 1882
- Laccophilus nigrocinctus Guignot, 1955
- Laccophilus nodieri Régimbart, 1895
- Laccophilus normifer Guignot, 1958
- Laccophilus notatus Boheman, 1858
- Laccophilus nubilus Régimbart, 1889
- Laccophilus nusatenggaraensis Hájek & Brancucci, 2015
- Laccophilus oberthueri Régimbart, 1889
- Laccophilus obesus Sharp, 1882
- Laccophilus obliquatus Régimbart, 1889
- Laccophilus occidentalis Biström, Nilsson & Bergsten, 2015
- Laccophilus octolineatus Zimmermann, 1921
- Laccophilus olsoufieffi Guignot, 1937
- Laccophilus ornatus Aubé, 1838
- Laccophilus oscillator Sharp, 1882
- Laccophilus ovatus Sharp, 1882
- Laccophilus pallescens Régimbart, 1903
- Laccophilus papuanus Balke, Larson & Hendrich, 1997
- Laccophilus paraguensis Régimbart, 1903
- Laccophilus paranus Guignot, 1957
- Laccophilus parvulus Aubé, 1838
- Laccophilus pellucidus Sharp, 1882
- Laccophilus penes Guignot, 1954
- Laccophilus peregrinus Zimmerman, 1970
- Laccophilus persimilis Régimbart, 1895
- Laccophilus pictipennis Sharp, 1882
- Laccophilus pictus Laporte, 1835
- Laccophilus plagiatus Régimbart, 1889
- Laccophilus planodes Guignot, 1955
- Laccophilus ploterus Spangler, 1966
- Laccophilus poecilus Klug, 1834 (Sussex Diving Beetle)
- Laccophilus posticus Aubé, 1838
- Laccophilus productus Régimbart, 1906
- Laccophilus propinquus Omer-Cooper, 1958
- Laccophilus proximus Say, 1823
- Laccophilus pseudanticatus Toledo, Hendrich & Stastný, 2002
- Laccophilus pseudomexicanus Zimmerman, 1970
- Laccophilus pseustes Guignot, 1955
- Laccophilus pulcher Bilardo & Rocchi, 2004
- Laccophilus pulicarius Sharp, 1882
- Laccophilus pullatus Omer-Cooper, 1958
- Laccophilus punctatissimus Brancucci, 1983
- Laccophilus pusulatus Zhang, 1989
- Laccophilus pyrraces Guignot, 1955
- Laccophilus quadrilineatus Horn, 1871
- Laccophilus quadrimaculatus Sharp, 1882
- Laccophilus quadrisignatus Laporte, 1835
- Laccophilus quadrivittatus Aubé, 1838
- Laccophilus quindecimvittatus Régimbart, 1895
- Laccophilus raitti Zimmerman, 1970
- Laccophilus rakouthae Manuel & Ramahandrison, 2020
- Laccophilus ramuensis Balke, Larson & Hendrich, 1997
- Laccophilus religatus Sharp, 1882
- Laccophilus remator Sharp, 1882
- Laccophilus remex Guignot, 1952
- Laccophilus restrictus Sharp, 1882
- Laccophilus ritsemae Régimbart, 1880
- Laccophilus rivulosus Klug, 1833
- Laccophilus rocchii Biström, Nilsson & Bergsten, 2015
- Laccophilus rotundatus Sharp, 1882
- Laccophilus ruficollis Zimmermann, 1919
- Laccophilus saegeri Guignot, 1958
- Laccophilus salobrinus Guignot, 1958
- Laccophilus salvini Sharp, 1882
- Laccophilus samuelsoni Brancucci, 1983
- Laccophilus schereri Brancucci, 1983
- Laccophilus schillhammeri Hájek & Brancucci, 2015
- Laccophilus schwarzi Fall, 1917
- Laccophilus secundus Régimbart, 1895
- Laccophilus seminiger Fauvel, 1883
- Laccophilus septicola Guignot, 1956
- Laccophilus seseanus Toledo, Hendrich & Stastný, 2002
- Laccophilus seyrigi Guignot, 1937
- Laccophilus sharpi Régimbart, 1889
- Laccophilus shinobi Yanagi & Akita, 2021
- Laccophilus siamensis Sharp, 1882
- Laccophilus simplex Sharp, 1882
- Laccophilus simplicistriatus Gschwendtner, 1932
- Laccophilus sinuosipenis Bilardo & Rocchi, 2019
- Laccophilus smithi Brancucci, 1983
- Laccophilus sonorensis Zimmerman, 1970
- Laccophilus sordidus Sharp, 1882
- Laccophilus spangleri Zimmerman, 1970
- Laccophilus spergatus Sharp, 1882
- Laccophilus stastnyi Hájek & Brancucci, 2015
- Laccophilus sublineatus Sharp, 1882
- Laccophilus subsignatus Sharp, 1882
- Laccophilus succineus Régimbart, 1889
- Laccophilus suffusus Sharp, 1882
- Laccophilus taeniolatus Régimbart, 1889
- Laccophilus tarsalis Sharp, 1882
- Laccophilus tavetensis Guignot, 1941
- Laccophilus testudo Régimbart, 1903
- Laccophilus tigrinus Guignot, 1959
- Laccophilus tiphius Guignot, 1955
- Laccophilus tobaensis Brancucci, 1983
- Laccophilus tonkinensis Brancucci, 1983
- Laccophilus traili Sharp, 1882
- Laccophilus transversalis Régimbart, 1877
- Laccophilus transversovittatus Biström, Nilsson & Bergsten, 2015
- Laccophilus tranversus Mouchamps, 1959
- Laccophilus trilineola Régimbart, 1889
- Laccophilus tschoffeni Régimbart, 1895
- Laccophilus turbatus Guignot, 1958
- Laccophilus uncletan Hájek & Stastný, 2005
- Laccophilus undatus Aubé, 1838
- Laccophilus uniformis Motschulsky, 1859
- Laccophilus univittatus Régimbart, 1892
- Laccophilus vacaensis Young, 1953
- Laccophilus vagelineatus Zimmermann, 1922
- Laccophilus vagepictus Sharp, 1882
- Laccophilus venezuelensis Régimbart, 1889
- Laccophilus venustus Chevrolat, 1863
- Laccophilus vermiculosus Gerstaecker, 1867
- Laccophilus vietnamensis Balke & Hendrich, 1997
- Laccophilus villiersi Bertrand & Legros, 1975
- Laccophilus walkeri J.Balfour-Browne, 1939
- Laccophilus wittmeri Brancucci, 1983
- Laccophilus wolfei Brancucci, 1983
- Laccophilus yoshitomii Watanabe & Kamite, 2018
- Laccophilus youngi Zimmerman, 1970
- Laccophilus yvietae Le Guillou, 1844
- Laccophilus zimmermani Arce-Pérez & Morón, 2017
