= Laccophilus ellipticus =

Scientific classification
- Kingdom: Animalia
- Phylum: Arthropoda
- Clade: Pancrustacea
- Class: Insecta
- Order: Coleoptera
- Suborder: Adephaga
- Family: Dytiscidae
- Subfamily: Laccophilinae
- Genus: Laccophilus
- Species: L. ellipticus

Binomial name
- Laccophilus ellipticus Régimbart, 1889

Synonyms
- Laccophilus flavescens Motschulsky, 1859

Species of beetle

Laccophilus ellipticus, is a species of predaceous diving beetle widespread in India, Myanmar, Sri Lanka, China, Cambodia, Indonesia, Thailand, and Vietnam.
