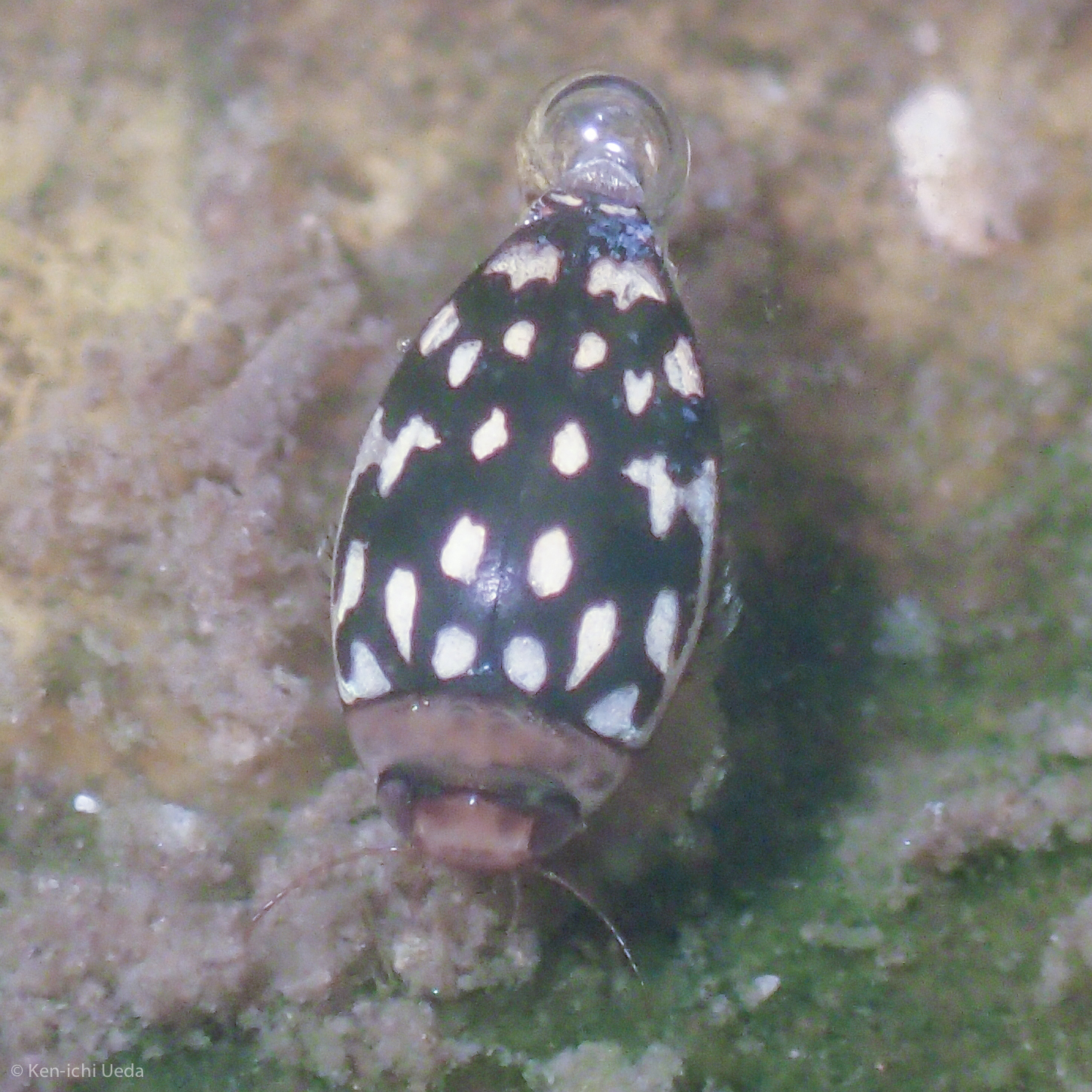

Scientific classification
- Kingdom: Animalia
- Phylum: Arthropoda
- Clade: Pancrustacea
- Class: Insecta
- Order: Coleoptera
- Suborder: Adephaga
- Family: Dytiscidae
- Genus: Laccophilus
- Species: L. pictus

Binomial name
- Laccophilus pictus Laporte, 1835

= Laccophilus pictus =

Species of beetle

Laccophilus pictus is a species of predaceous diving beetle in the family Dytiscidae. It is found in the Neotropics.

== Subspecies ==
These three subspecies belong to the species Laccophilus pictus:

- Laccophilus pictus coccinelloides Régimbart, 1889
- Laccophilus pictus insignis Sharp, 1882
- Laccophilus pictus pictus Laporte, 1835
