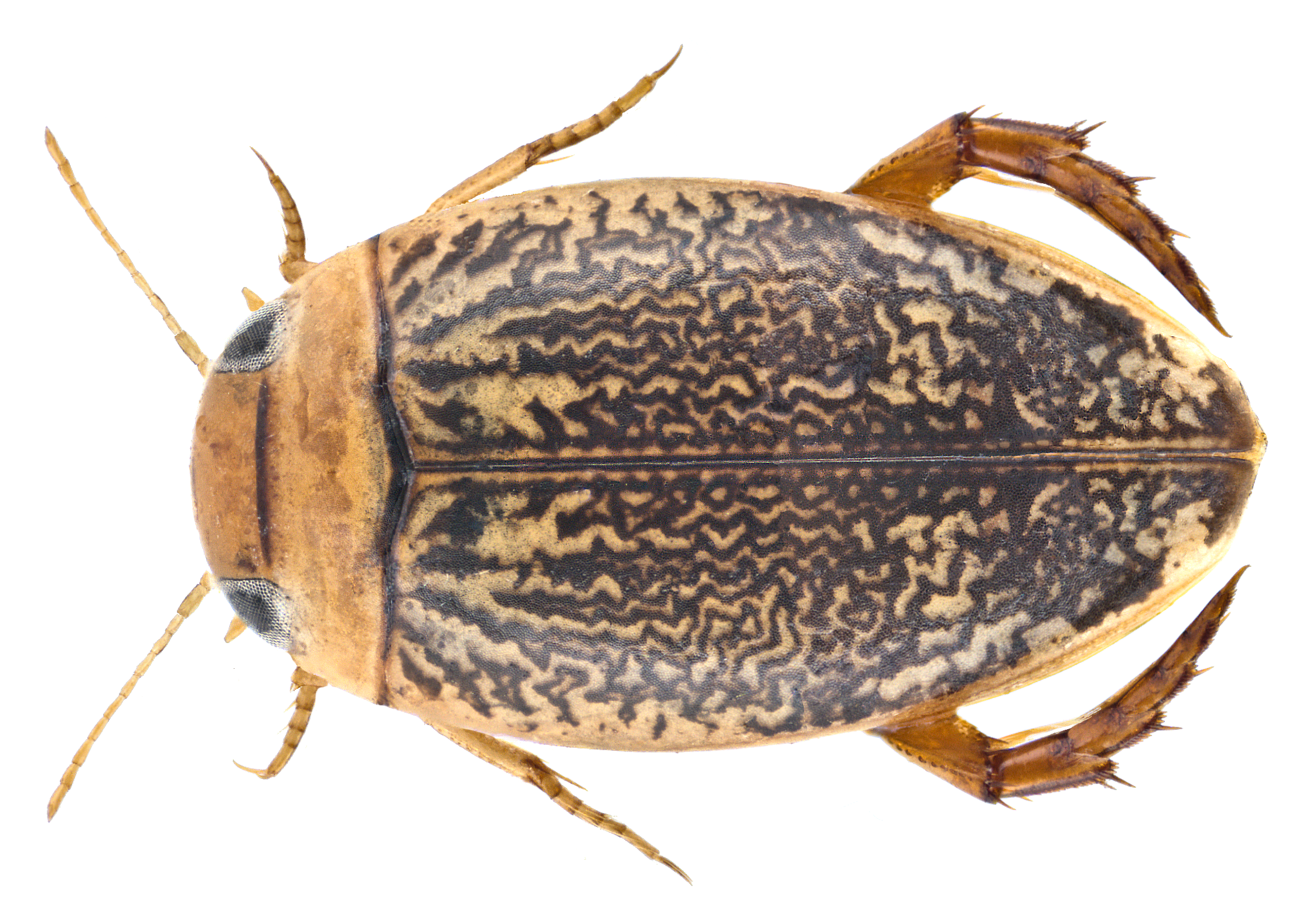

Scientific classification
- Kingdom: Animalia
- Phylum: Arthropoda
- Clade: Pancrustacea
- Class: Insecta
- Order: Coleoptera
- Suborder: Adephaga
- Family: Dytiscidae
- Genus: Laccophilus
- Species: L. parvulus

Binomial name
- Laccophilus parvulus Aubé, 1838

Synonyms
- Laccophilus derasus Sharp, 1882; Laccophilus dispersus Sharp, 1882; Laccophilus orientalis Aubé, 1838; Laccophilus proteus Régimbart, 1877; Laccophilus undulifer Motschulsky, 1859

= Laccophilus parvulus =

Species of beetle

Laccophilus parvulus, is a species of predaceous diving beetle found in South and South East Asia.

== Subspecies ==
Two subspecies have been identified. Typical body length is about 3.4 mm.

- Laccophilus parvulus obtusus Sharp, 1882 - India, Bangladesh, Nepal, Cambodia, China, Indonesia, Laos, Singapore, Thailand, Vietnam
- Laccophilus parvulus parvulus Aubé, 1838 - India, Bangladesh, Bhutan, Myanmar, Nepal, Pakistan, Sri Lanka; China, Indonesia, Malaysia, Philippines, Singapore, Thailand, Vietnam

== Biology ==
The fungus Chitonomyces bakeri has been identified as a parasitic ascomycote from adult beetles. Adults are voracious predators on mosquito larva of Culex species.
