= Laccophilus ceylonicus =

Scientific classification
- Kingdom: Animalia
- Phylum: Arthropoda
- Clade: Pancrustacea
- Class: Insecta
- Order: Coleoptera
- Suborder: Adephaga
- Family: Dytiscidae
- Genus: Laccophilus
- Species: L. ceylonicus

Binomial name
- Laccophilus ceylonicus Zimmermann, 1919

Synonyms
- Laccophilus horni Régimbart, 1902

Species of beetle

Laccophilus ceylonicus, is a species of predaceous diving beetle found in India and Sri Lanka.
