= Laccophilus quadrilineatus =

Scientific classification
- Kingdom: Animalia
- Phylum: Arthropoda
- Clade: Pancrustacea
- Class: Insecta
- Order: Coleoptera
- Suborder: Adephaga
- Family: Dytiscidae
- Genus: Laccophilus
- Species: L. quadrilineatus

Binomial name
- Laccophilus quadrilineatus Horn, 1871

Species of beetle

Laccophilus quadrilineatus is a species of predaceous diving beetle in the family Dytiscidae. It is found in North America and the Neotropics.

== Subspecies ==
These three subspecies belong to the species Laccophilus quadrilineatus:

- Laccophilus quadrilineatus mayae Zimmerman, 1970
- Laccophilus quadrilineatus quadrilineatus Horn, 1871
- Laccophilus quadrilineatus tehuanensis Zimmerman, 1970
