= Laccophilus horni =

Scientific classification
- Kingdom: Animalia
- Phylum: Arthropoda
- Clade: Pancrustacea
- Class: Insecta
- Order: Coleoptera
- Suborder: Adephaga
- Family: Dytiscidae
- Genus: Laccophilus
- Species: L. horni

Binomial name
- Laccophilus horni Branden, 1885

Species of beetle

Laccophilus horni is a species of predaceous diving beetle in the family Dytiscidae. It is found in North America and the Neotropics.
