= Laccophilus undatus =

Scientific classification
- Kingdom: Animalia
- Phylum: Arthropoda
- Clade: Pancrustacea
- Class: Insecta
- Order: Coleoptera
- Suborder: Adephaga
- Family: Dytiscidae
- Genus: Laccophilus
- Species: L. undatus

Binomial name
- Laccophilus undatus Aubé, 1838

Species of beetle

Laccophilus undatus is a species of predaceous diving beetle in the family Dytiscidae. It is found in North America.
