= Laccophilus wolfei =

Scientific classification
- Kingdom: Animalia
- Phylum: Arthropoda
- Clade: Pancrustacea
- Class: Insecta
- Order: Coleoptera
- Suborder: Adephaga
- Family: Dytiscidae
- Subfamily: Laccophilinae
- Genus: Laccophilus
- Species: L. wolfei

Binomial name
- Laccophilus wolfei Brancucci, 1983

Synonyms
- Laccophilus rufulus Régimbart, 1888; Laccophilus weyersi Régimbart, 1900

Species of beetle

Laccophilus wolfei, is a species of predaceous diving beetle found in India and Sri Lanka.
