= Hyphoporus interpulsus =

Scientific classification
- Kingdom: Animalia
- Phylum: Arthropoda
- Class: Insecta
- Order: Coleoptera
- Suborder: Adephaga
- Family: Dytiscidae
- Genus: Hyphoporus
- Species: H. interpulsus

Binomial name
- Hyphoporus interpulsus (Walker, 1858)

Synonyms
- Hydroporus interpulsus Walker, 1858

Species of beetle

Hyphoporus interpulsus, is a species of predaceous diving beetle found in Sri Lanka.
