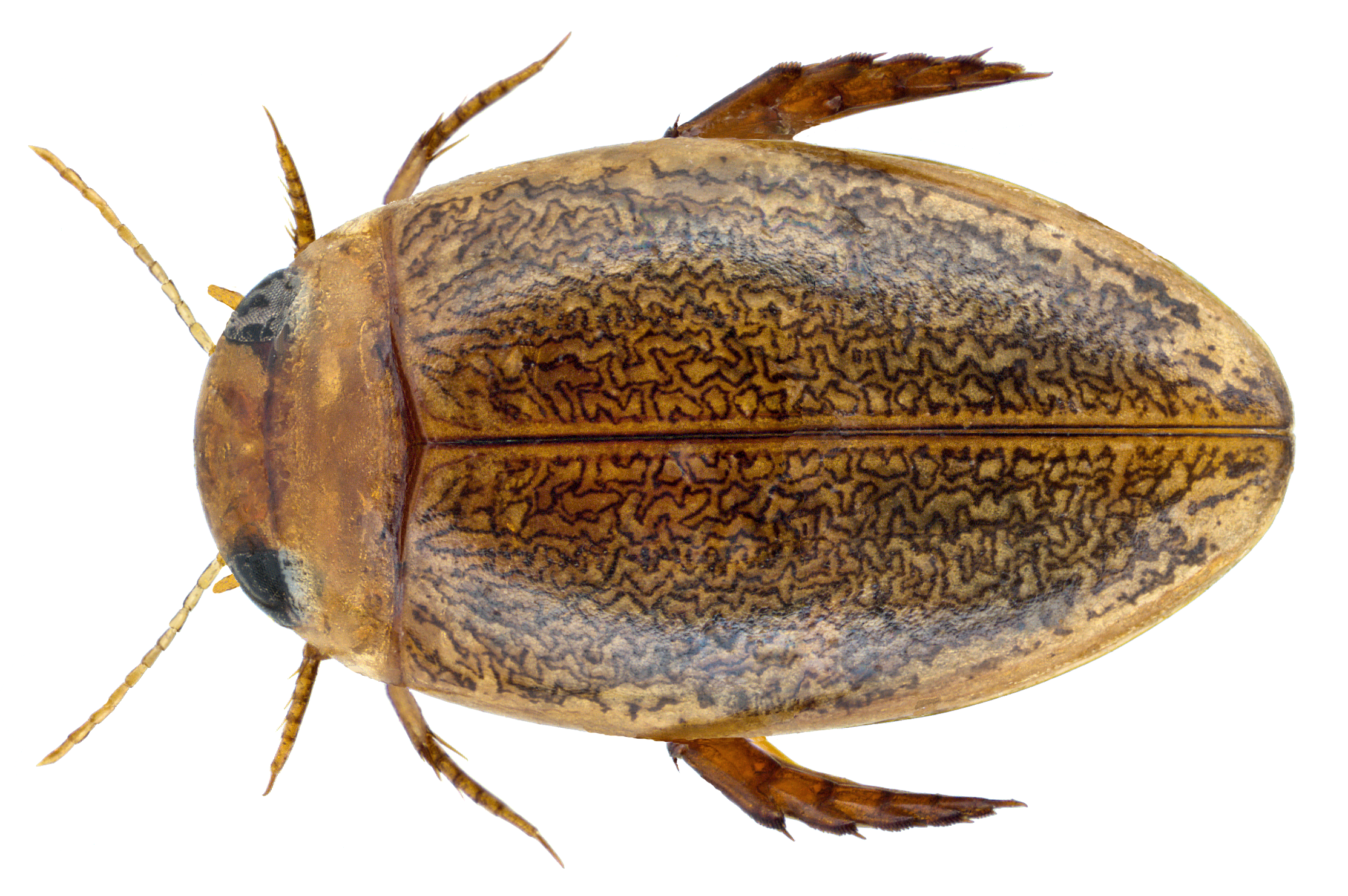

Scientific classification
- Kingdom: Animalia
- Phylum: Arthropoda
- Clade: Pancrustacea
- Class: Insecta
- Order: Coleoptera
- Suborder: Adephaga
- Family: Dytiscidae
- Genus: Laccophilus
- Species: L. flexuosus

Binomial name
- Laccophilus flexuosus Aubé, 1838

Synonyms
- Laccophilus chloroticus Régimbart, 1887; Laccophilus cognatus Sharp, 1882; Laccophilus formosanus Takizawa, 1932; Laccophilus solutus Sharp, 1882

= Laccophilus flexuosus =

Species of beetle

Laccophilus flexuosus, is a species of predaceous diving beetle found in India, Bangladesh, Myanmar, Nepal, Pakistan, Sri Lanka, Cambodia, China, Hong Kong, Indonesia, Iran, Iraq, Japan, Taiwan, Cambodia, Laos and Vietnam.

== Description ==
This elongated oval species has a body length of 4.3 mm.
