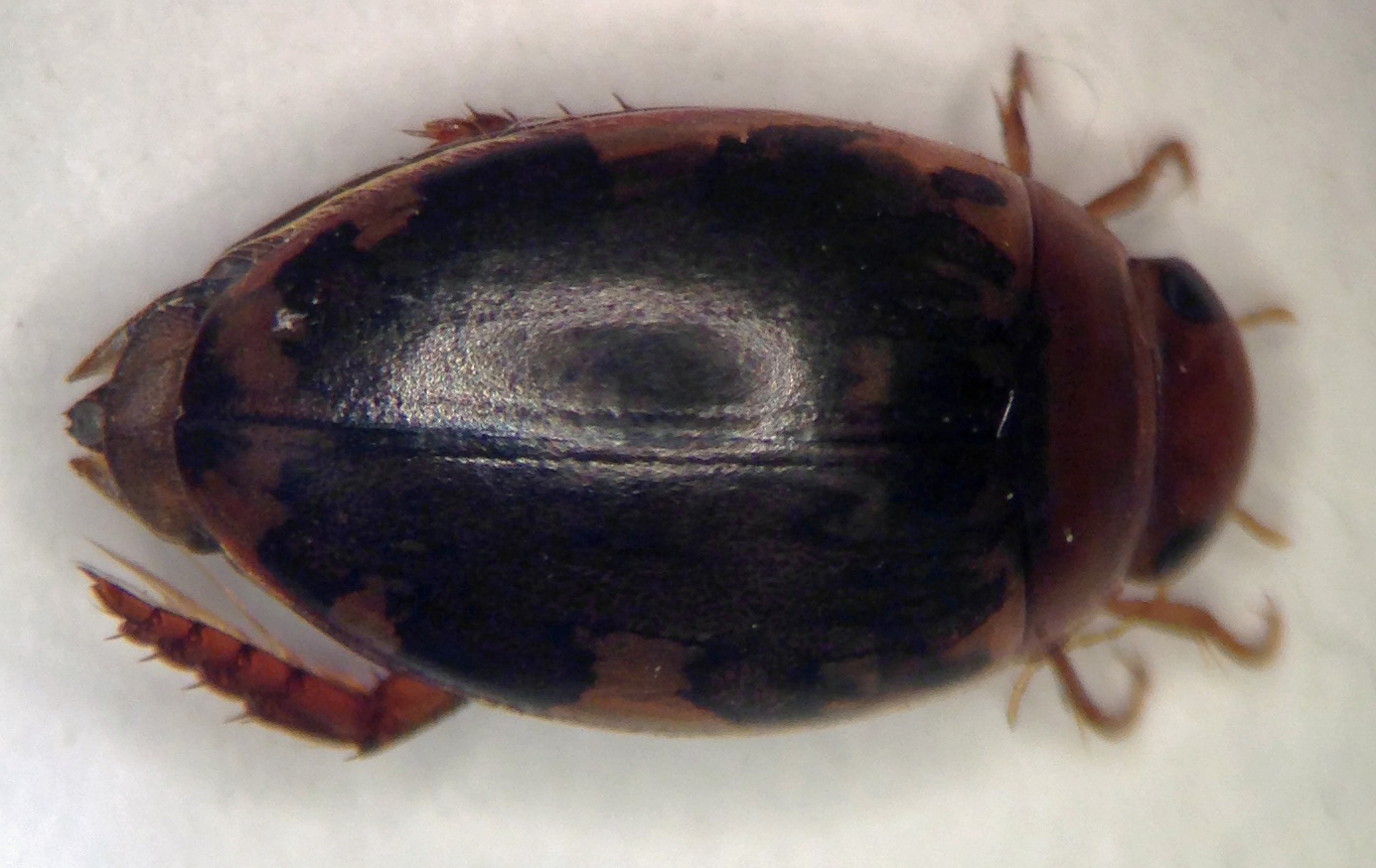

Scientific classification
- Kingdom: Animalia
- Phylum: Arthropoda
- Clade: Pancrustacea
- Class: Insecta
- Order: Coleoptera
- Suborder: Adephaga
- Family: Dytiscidae
- Genus: Laccophilus
- Species: L. maculosus

Binomial name
- Laccophilus maculosus Say, 1823

= Laccophilus maculosus =

Species of beetle

Laccophilus maculosus, the dingy diver, is a species of predaceous diving beetle in the family Dytiscidae. It is found in Central America and North America.

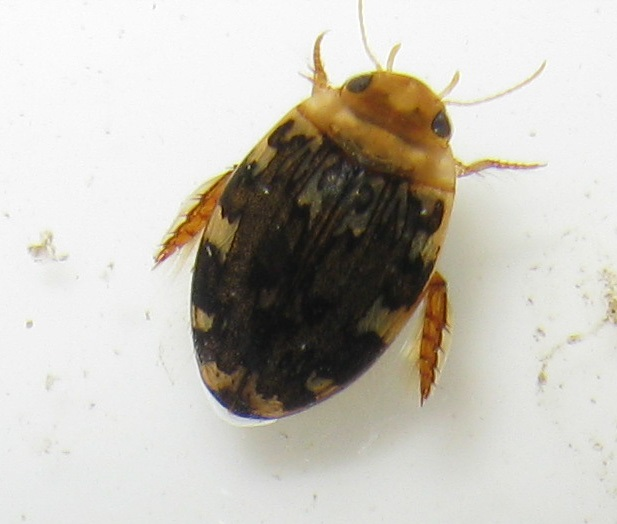
Laccophilus maculosus maculosus

== Subspecies ==
These three subspecies belong to the species Laccophilus maculosus:

- Laccophilus maculosus decipiens LeConte, 1852^{i c g b}
- Laccophilus maculosus maculosus Say, 1823^{i c g b}
- Laccophilus maculosus shermani Leech, 1944^{i c g b}

Data sources: i = ITIS, c = Catalogue of Life, g = GBIF, b = Bugguide.net
