= Laccophilus sharpi =

Scientific classification
- Kingdom: Animalia
- Phylum: Arthropoda
- Clade: Pancrustacea
- Class: Insecta
- Order: Coleoptera
- Suborder: Adephaga
- Family: Dytiscidae
- Genus: Laccophilus
- Species: L. sharpi

Binomial name
- Laccophilus sharpi Régimbart, 1889

Species of beetle

Laccophilus sharpi, is a species of predaceous diving beetle found in Asia, Africa and Australian region.

== Distribution ==
It is widely distributed throughout India, Myanmar, Nepal, Pakistan, Sri Lanka, China, Hong Kong, Indonesia, Iran, Iraq, Japan, Philippines, Saudi Arabia, South Korea, Taiwan, Vietnam.
