= Laccophilus guttalis =

Scientific classification
- Kingdom: Animalia
- Phylum: Arthropoda
- Clade: Pancrustacea
- Class: Insecta
- Order: Coleoptera
- Suborder: Adephaga
- Family: Dytiscidae
- Subfamily: Laccophilinae
- Genus: Laccophilus
- Species: L. guttalis

Binomial name
- Laccophilus guttalis Régimbart, 1893

Synonyms
- Laccophilus flavescens Motschulsky, 1859

Species of beetle

Laccophilus guttalis, is a species of predaceous diving beetle found in Bangladesh and Sri Lanka.
