= Hygrotus sayi =

Scientific classification
- Domain: Eukaryota
- Kingdom: Animalia
- Phylum: Arthropoda
- Class: Insecta
- Order: Coleoptera
- Suborder: Adephaga
- Family: Dytiscidae
- Genus: Hygrotus
- Species: H. sayi

Binomial name
- Hygrotus sayi J. Balfour-Browne, 1944

Species of beetle

Hygrotus sayi is a species of predaceous diving beetle in the family Dytiscidae. It is found in North America.
