= Blethisa julii =

Scientific classification
- Domain: Eukaryota
- Kingdom: Animalia
- Phylum: Arthropoda
- Class: Insecta
- Order: Coleoptera
- Suborder: Adephaga
- Family: Carabidae
- Genus: Blethisa
- Species: B. julii

Binomial name
- Blethisa julii Leconte, 1863

Species of ground beetle

Blethisa julii is a species of ground beetle in the family Carabidae. It is found in North America.
