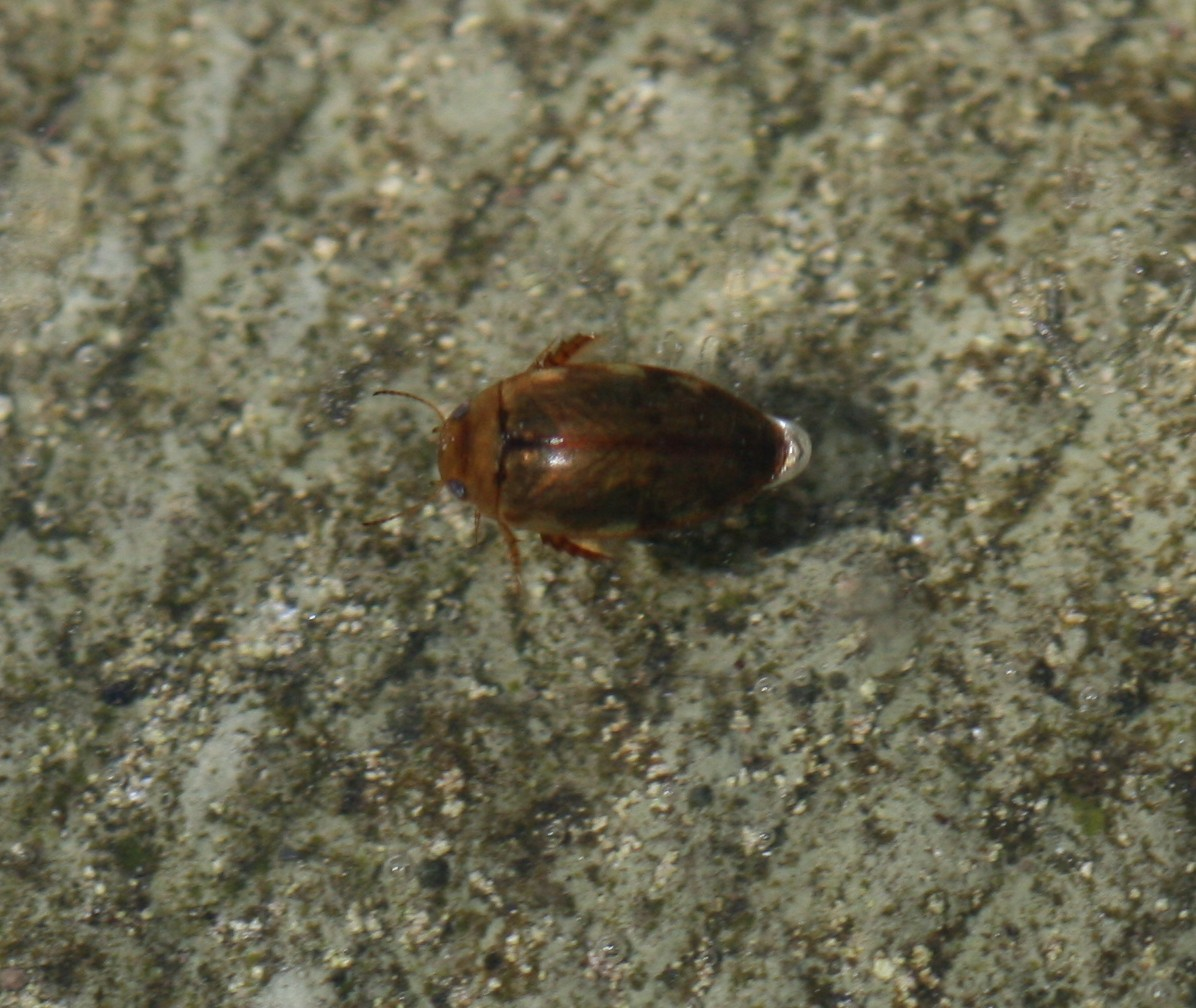

Scientific classification
- Kingdom: Animalia
- Phylum: Arthropoda
- Clade: Pancrustacea
- Class: Insecta
- Order: Coleoptera
- Suborder: Adephaga
- Family: Dytiscidae
- Genus: Laccophilus
- Species: L. minutus

Binomial name
- Laccophilus minutus (Linnaeus, 1758)

= Laccophilus minutus =

Species of beetle

Laccophilus minutus is a species of beetle belonging to the family Dytiscidae.

It is native to Europe.
