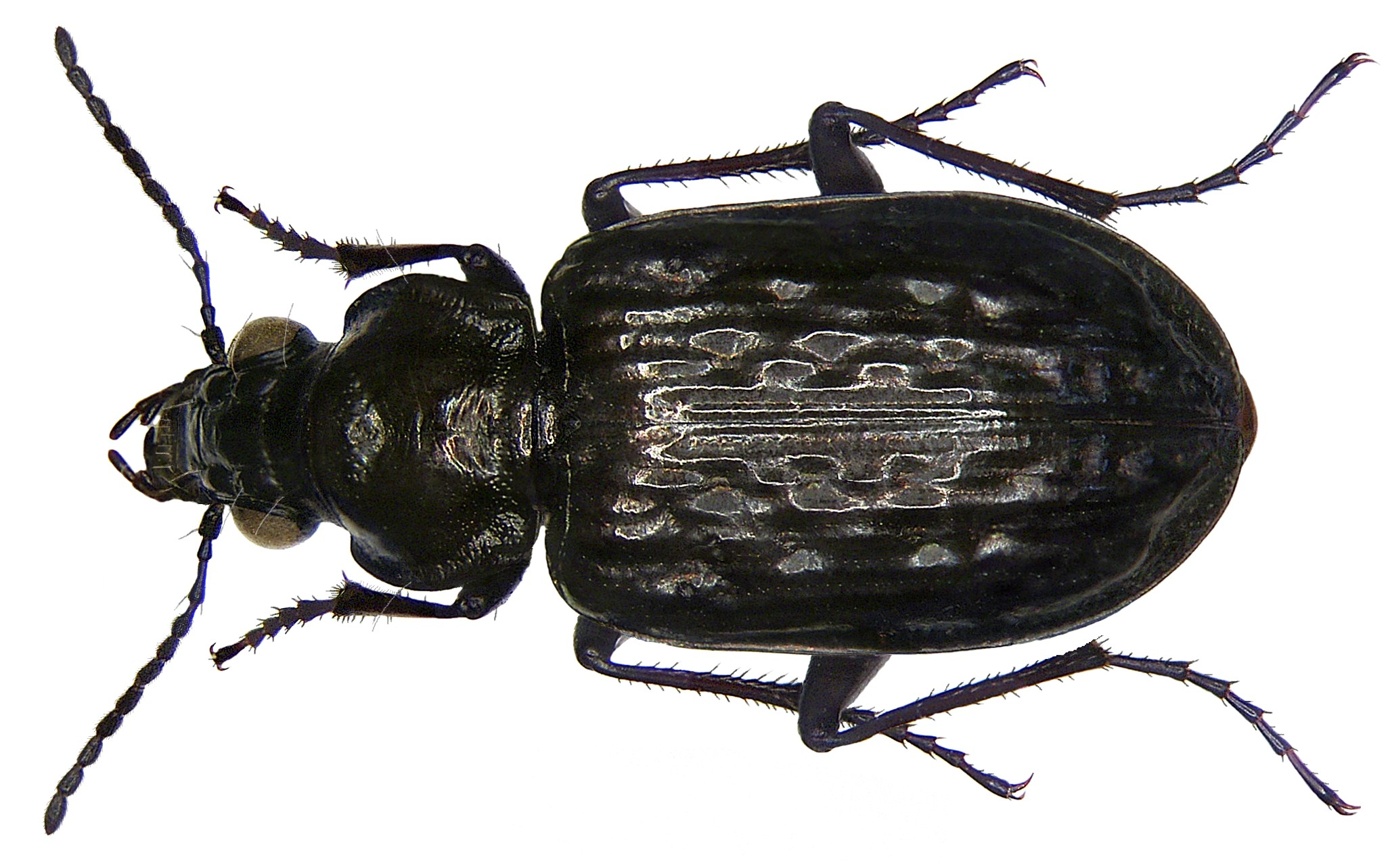

Scientific classification
- Kingdom: Animalia
- Phylum: Arthropoda
- Clade: Pancrustacea
- Class: Insecta
- Order: Coleoptera
- Suborder: Adephaga
- Family: Carabidae
- Genus: Blethisa
- Species: B. multipunctata

Binomial name
- Blethisa multipunctata (Linnaeus, 1758)

= Blethisa multipunctata =

Species of ground beetle

Blethisa multipunctata is a species of ground beetle native to Europe. The habitat is stream, river and lake margins. It is amphibious, able to hunt below water for up to an hour. It is commonly known as the multidotted ground beetle.
