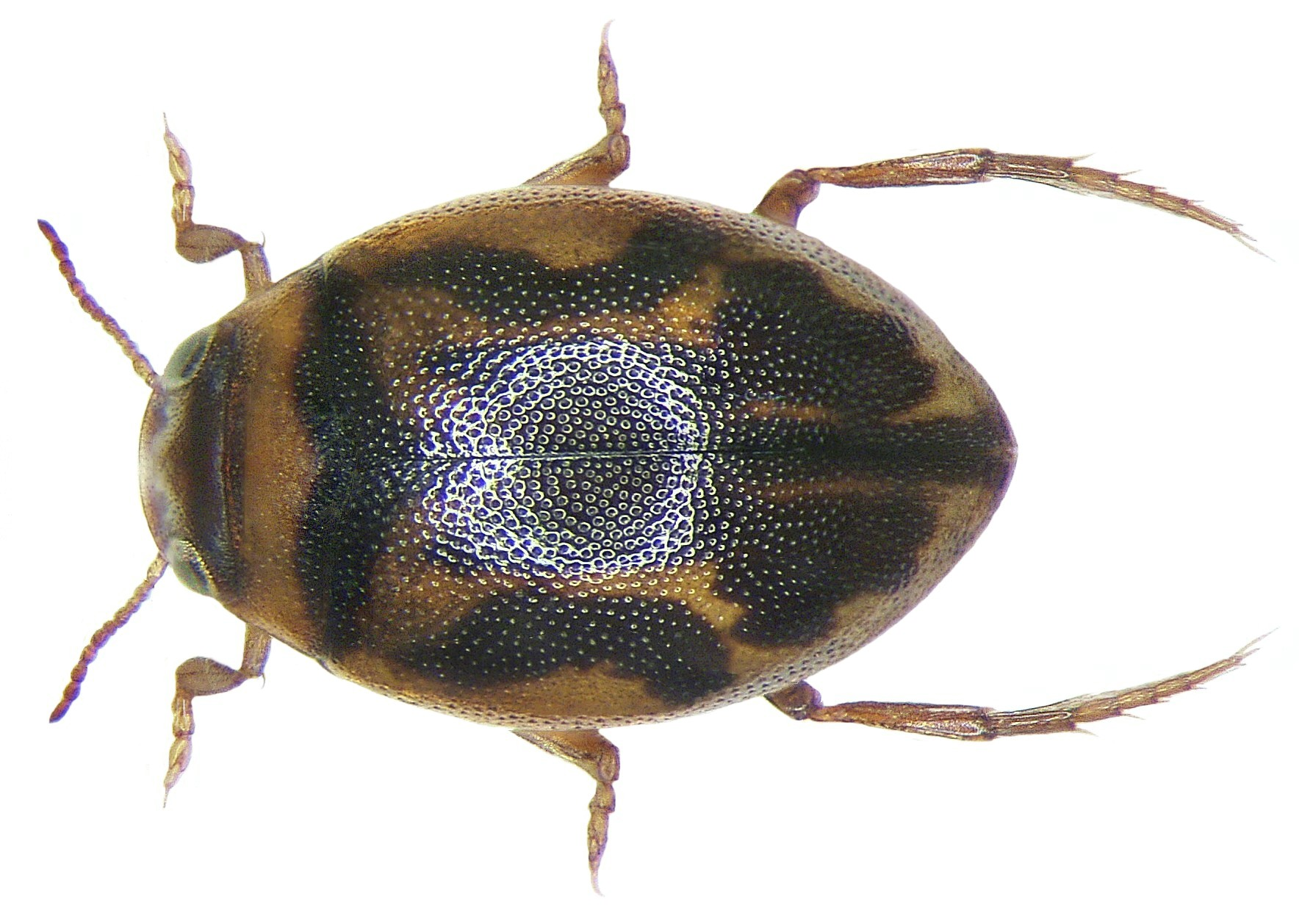
- Hygrotus inaequalis

Scientific classification
- Domain: Eukaryota
- Kingdom: Animalia
- Phylum: Arthropoda
- Class: Insecta
- Order: Coleoptera
- Suborder: Adephaga
- Family: Dytiscidae
- Subfamily: Hydroporinae
- Tribe: Hygrotini
- Genus: Hygrotus; Stephens, 1828

= Hygrotus =

Genus of beetles

Hygrotus is a genus of beetle in family Dytiscidae. It contains two subgenera (Coelambus and Hygrotus) and about 70 species, including:

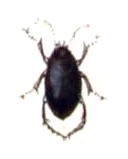
H. improssopunctatus

- Hygrotus acaroides (LeConte, 1855)
- Hygrotus aequalis Falkenström, 1932
- Hygrotus ahmeti Hájek, Fery & Erman, 2005
- Hygrotus armeniacus (Zaitzev, 1927)
- Hygrotus artus (Fall, 1919)
- Hygrotus berneri Young & Wolfe, 1984
- Hygrotus bruesi (Fall, 1928)
- Hygrotus caspius (Wehncke, 1875)
- Hygrotus chinensis (Sharp, 1882)
- Hygrotus collatus (Fall, 1919)
- Hygrotus compar (Fall, 1919)
- Hygrotus confluens (Fabricius, 1787)
- Hygrotus corpulentus (Schaum, 1864)
- Hygrotus cribrarius (Scudder, 1900)
- Hygrotus curvilobus Fery, Sadeghi & Hosseinie, 2005
- Hygrotus curvipes (Leech, 1938)
- Hygrotus decoratus (Gyllenhal, 1810)
- Hygrotus derelictus (Scudder, 1900)
- Hygrotus disjectus (Scudder, 1900)
- Hygrotus dissimilis (Gemminger & Harold, 1868)
- Hygrotus diversipes Leech, 1966
- Hygrotus dzieduszyckii (Lomnicki, 1894)
- Hygrotus enneagrammus (Ahrens, 1833)
- Hygrotus falli (Wallis, 1924)
- Hygrotus farctus (LeConte, 1855)
- Hygrotus femoratus (Fall, 1901)
- Hygrotus flaviventris (Motschulsky, 1860)
- Hygrotus fontinalis Leech, 1966
- Hygrotus fraternus (LeConte, 1852)
- Hygrotus fresnedai (Fery, 1992)
- Hygrotus fumatus (Sharp, 1882)
- Hygrotus ganglbaueri (Lomnicki, 1894)
- Hygrotus hydropicus (LeConte, 1852)
- Hygrotus impressopunctatus (Schaller, 1783)
- Hygrotus inaequalis (Fabricius, 1777)
- Hygrotus infernalis (Scudder, 1900)
- Hygrotus infuscatus (Sharp, 1882)
- Hygrotus inscriptus (Sharp, 1882)
- Hygrotus intermedius (Fall, 1919)
- Hygrotus laccophilinus (LeConte, 1878)
- Hygrotus lagari (Fery, 1992)
- Hygrotus latefasciatus (Lomnicki, 1894)
- Hygrotus lernaeus (Schaum, 1857)
- Hygrotus lutescens (LeConte, 1852)
- Hygrotus marginipennis (Blatchley, 1912)
- Hygrotus marklini (Gyllenhal, 1813)
- Hygrotus masculinus (Crotch, 1874)
- Hygrotus miocenus (Wickham, 1912)
- Hygrotus niedzwiedzkii (Lomnicki, 1894)
- Hygrotus nigrescens (Fall, 1919)
- Hygrotus nigrolineatus (Steven, 1808)
- Hygrotus novemlineatus (Stephens, 1829)
- Hygrotus nubilus (LeConte, 1855)
- Hygrotus obscureplagiatus (Fall, 1919)
- Hygrotus orthogrammus (Sharp, 1882)
- Hygrotus ozokeriticus (Lomnicki, 1894)
- Hygrotus pallidulus (Aubé, 1850)
- Hygrotus parallellogrammus (Ahrens, 1812)
- Hygrotus patruelis (LeConte, 1855)
- Hygrotus pectoralis (Motschulsky, 1860)
- Hygrotus pedalis (Fall, 1901)
- Hygrotus picatus (Kirby, 1837)
- Hygrotus picipoides (Lomnicki, 1894)
- Hygrotus polonicus (Aubé, 1842)
- Hygrotus punctilineatus (Fall, 1919)
- Hygrotus quinquelineatus (Zetterstedt, 1828)
- Hygrotus saginatus (Schaum, 1857)
- Hygrotus salinarius (Wallis, 1924)
- Hygrotus sanfilippoi (Fery, 1992)
- Hygrotus sayi J.Balfour-Browne, 1944
- Hygrotus sellatus (LeConte, 1866)
- Hygrotus semenowi (Jakovlev, 1899)
- Hygrotus semivittatus (Fall, 1919)
- Hygrotus stefanschoedli Fery, Sadeghi & Hosseinie, 2005
- Hygrotus suturalis (LeConte, 1850)
- Hygrotus sylvanus (Fall, 1917)
- Hygrotus thermarum (Darlington, 1928)
- Hygrotus tumidiventris (Fall, 1919)
- Hygrotus turbidus (LeConte, 1855)
- Hygrotus unguicularis (Crotch, 1874)
- Hygrotus urgensis (Jakovlev, 1899)
- Hygrotus versicolor (Schaller, 1783)
- Hygrotus wardii (Clark, 1862)
- Hygrotus zigetangco Fery, 2003
