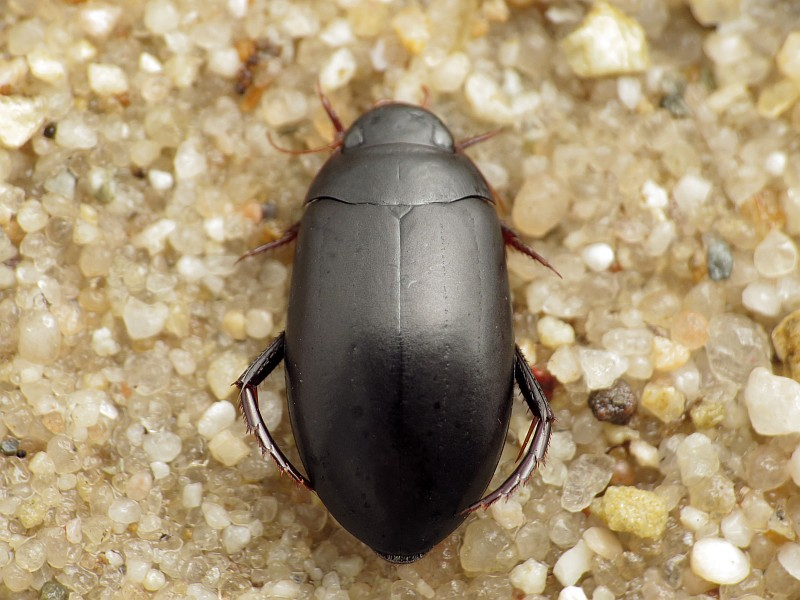
- Nartus grapii, The Netherlands

Scientific classification
- Kingdom: Animalia
- Phylum: Arthropoda
- Class: Insecta
- Order: Coleoptera
- Suborder: Adephaga
- Family: Dytiscidae
- Subfamily: Colymbetinae
- Tribe: Colymbetini
- Genus: Nartus
- Species: N. grapii

Binomial name
- Nartus grapii (Gyllenhal, 1808)

= Nartus grapii =

Species of beetle

Nartus grapii is a species of beetle in family Dytiscidae, found in the Palearctic. This species was formerly a member of the genus Rhantus.
