= Nartus sinuatus =

Scientific classification
- Domain: Eukaryota
- Kingdom: Animalia
- Phylum: Arthropoda
- Class: Insecta
- Order: Coleoptera
- Suborder: Adephaga
- Family: Dytiscidae
- Subfamily: Colymbetinae
- Tribe: Colymbetini
- Genus: Nartus
- Species: N. sinuatus

Binomial name
- Nartus sinuatus (LeConte, 1862)

Species of beetle

Nartus sinuatus Black with dark rufous legs; posterior margin of pronotum arched just before hind angles(3) is a species of predaceous diving beetle in the family Dytiscidae, found in North America. This species was formerly a member of the genus Rhantus.
