= Carabdytes alutaceus =

Conservation status
- Endangered (IUCN 2.3)

Scientific classification
- Kingdom: Animalia
- Phylum: Arthropoda
- Clade: Pancrustacea
- Class: Insecta
- Order: Coleoptera
- Suborder: Adephaga
- Family: Dytiscidae
- Subfamily: Colymbetinae
- Tribe: Colymbetini
- Genus: Carabdytes
- Species: C. alutaceus

Binomial name
- Carabdytes alutaceus (Fauvel, 1883)

Species of beetle

Carabdytes alutaceus is an endangered species of beetle in the family Dytiscidae. It is endemic to New Caledonia, in the southwest Pacific Ocean.

This species was formerly a member of the genus Rhantus.
