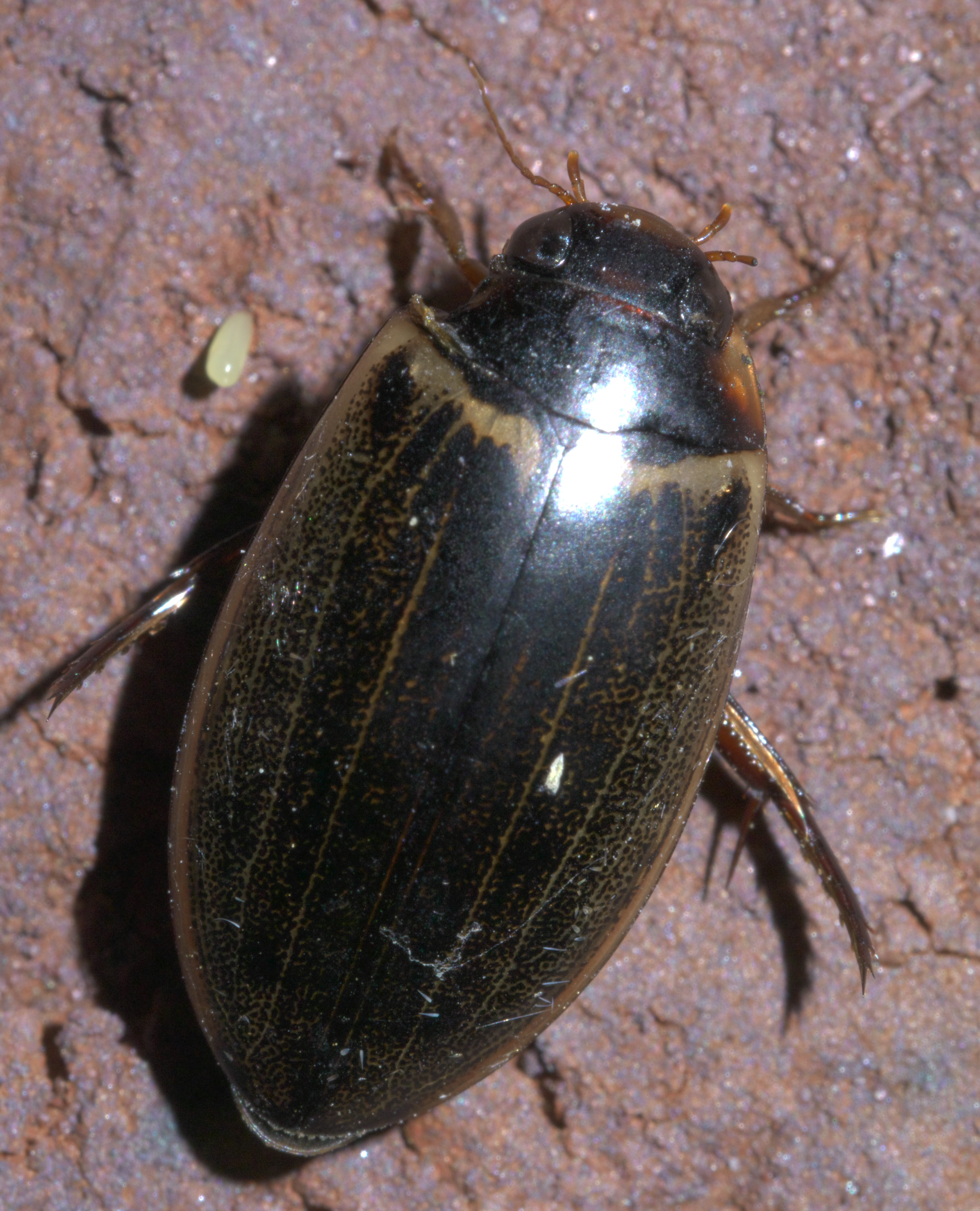

Scientific classification
- Kingdom: Animalia
- Phylum: Arthropoda
- Clade: Pancrustacea
- Class: Insecta
- Order: Coleoptera
- Suborder: Adephaga
- Family: Dytiscidae
- Subfamily: Colymbetinae
- Tribe: Colymbetini
- Genus: Meridiorhantus
- Species: M. calidus

Binomial name
- Meridiorhantus calidus (Fabricius, 1792)

= Meridiorhantus calidus =

Species of beetle

Meridiorhantus calidus is a species of predaceous diving beetle in the family Dytiscidae. It is found in North America and the Neotropics. This species was formerly a member of the genus Rhantus.
