= Carabdytes plantaris =

Conservation status
- Naturally Uncommon (NZ TCS)

Scientific classification
- Kingdom: Animalia
- Phylum: Arthropoda
- Clade: Pancrustacea
- Class: Insecta
- Order: Coleoptera
- Suborder: Adephaga
- Family: Dytiscidae
- Subfamily: Colymbetinae
- Tribe: Colymbetini
- Genus: Carabdytes
- Species: C. plantaris

Binomial name
- Carabdytes plantaris (Sharp, 1882)

Species of beetle

Carabdytes plantaris is a naturally uncommon species of diving beetle in the family Dytiscidae. It is endemic to New Zealand. For over a century, it was known from just a single specimen collected in 1880 "near Dunedin", and doubts were cast on whether it was actually a New Zealand species at all. In 1986, it was rediscovered when several were collected from a roadside pond near Lake Ellesmere. Carabdytes plantaris is now classed as "naturally uncommon" by the Department of Conservation.

This species was formerly a member of the genus Rhantus.
