= Meridiorhantus orbignyi =

Conservation status
- Extinct (IUCN 2.3)

Scientific classification
- Kingdom: Animalia
- Phylum: Arthropoda
- Class: Insecta
- Order: Coleoptera
- Suborder: Adephaga
- Family: Dytiscidae
- Subfamily: Colymbetinae
- Tribe: Colymbetini
- Genus: Meridiorhantus
- Species: †M. orbignyi

Binomial name
- †Meridiorhantus orbignyi (Balke, 1992)

Species of beetle

Meridiorhantus orbignyi is an extinct species of predaceous diving beetle in the family Dytiscidae. This species was formerly a member of the genus Rhantus.
