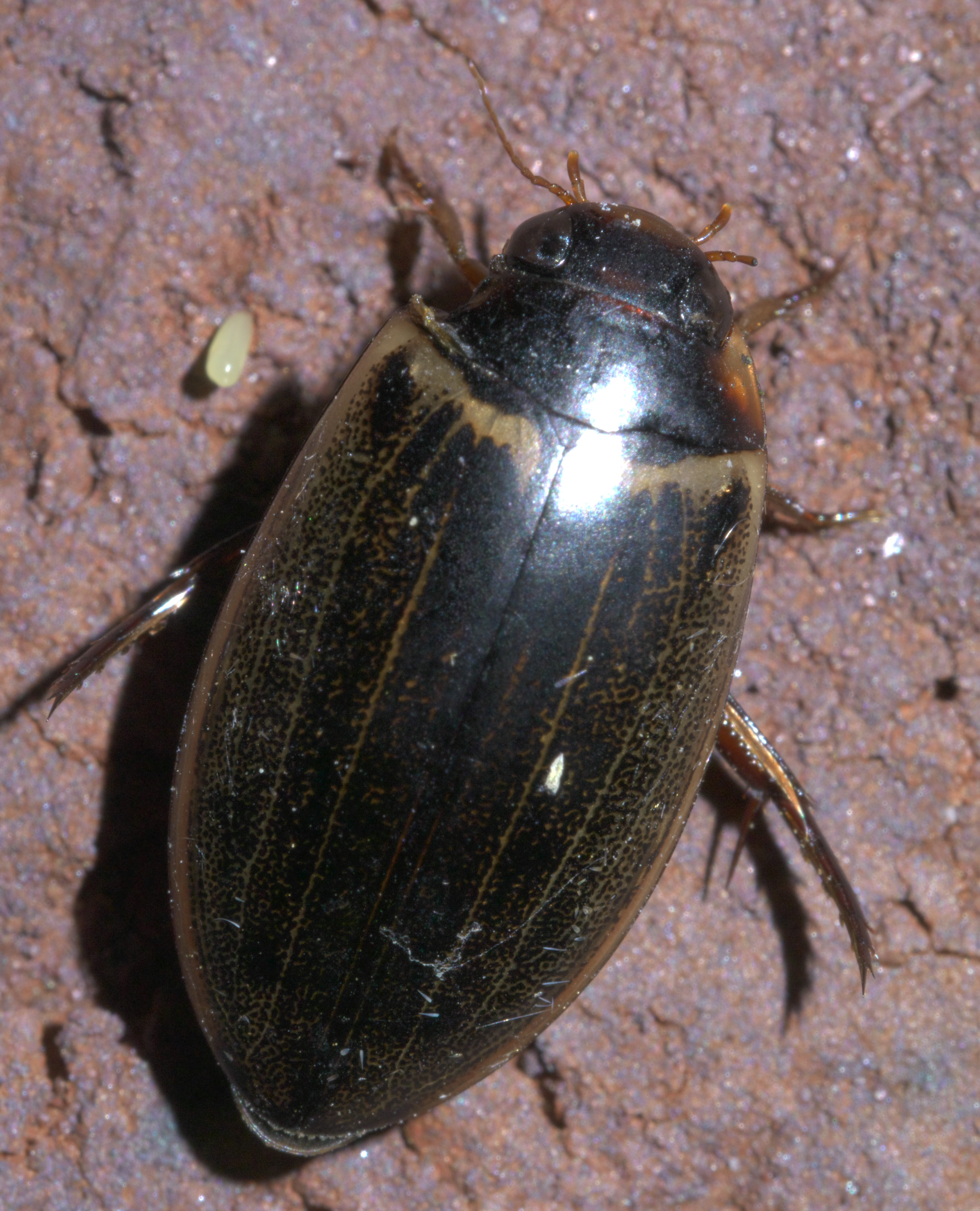
- Meridiorhantus calidus, Oklahoma

Scientific classification
- Kingdom: Animalia
- Phylum: Arthropoda
- Class: Insecta
- Order: Coleoptera
- Suborder: Adephaga
- Family: Dytiscidae
- Subfamily: Colymbetinae
- Tribe: Colymbetini
- Genus: Meridiorhantus; Balke, Hajek & Hendrich, 2017

= Meridiorhantus =

Genus of beetles

Meridiorhantus is a genus of predaceous diving beetles in the family Dytiscidae. There are about five described species in Meridiorhantus, found in the Neotropics and North America. These species were formerly members of the genus Rhantus, but were moved to Meridiorhantus when it was created by Balke et al. in 2017.

== Species ==
These five species belong to the genus Meridiorhantus:

- Meridiorhantus antarcticus (Germain, 1854)
- Meridiorhantus calidus (Fabricius, 1792)
- Meridiorhantus limbatus (Aubé, 1838)
- †Meridiorhantus orbignyi (Balke, 1992)
- Meridiorhantus validus (Sharp, 1882)
