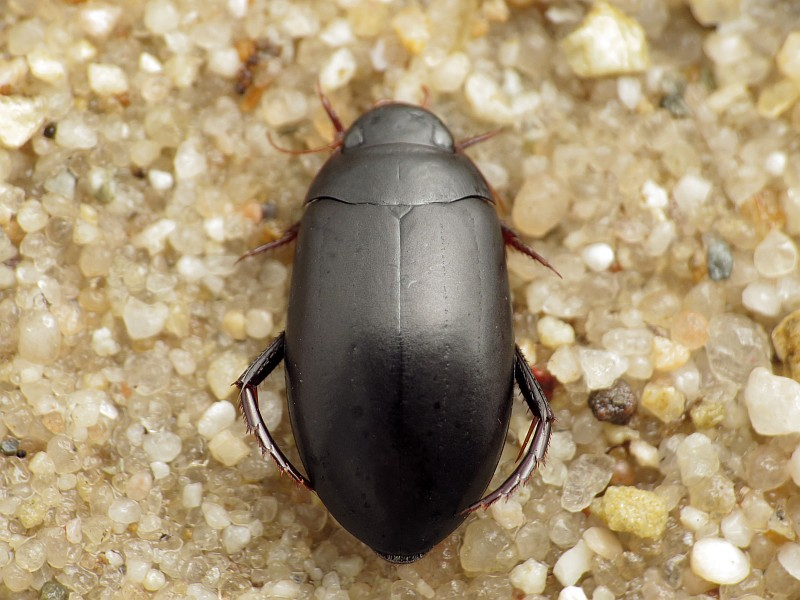
- Rhantus grapii, The Netherlands

Scientific classification
- Domain: Eukaryota
- Kingdom: Animalia
- Phylum: Arthropoda
- Class: Insecta
- Order: Coleoptera
- Suborder: Adephaga
- Family: Dytiscidae
- Subfamily: Colymbetinae
- Tribe: Colymbetini
- Genus: Nartus

= Nartus =

Genus of beetles

Nartus is a genus of predaceous diving beetles in the family Dytiscidae. There are at least two described species in Nartus. These species were formerly members of the genus Rhantus, but were moved to Nartus when it was reinstated by Balke et al. in 2017.

== Species ==
These two species belong to the genus Nartus:

- Nartus grapii (Gyllenhal, 1808)
- Nartus sinuatus (LeConte, 1862)
