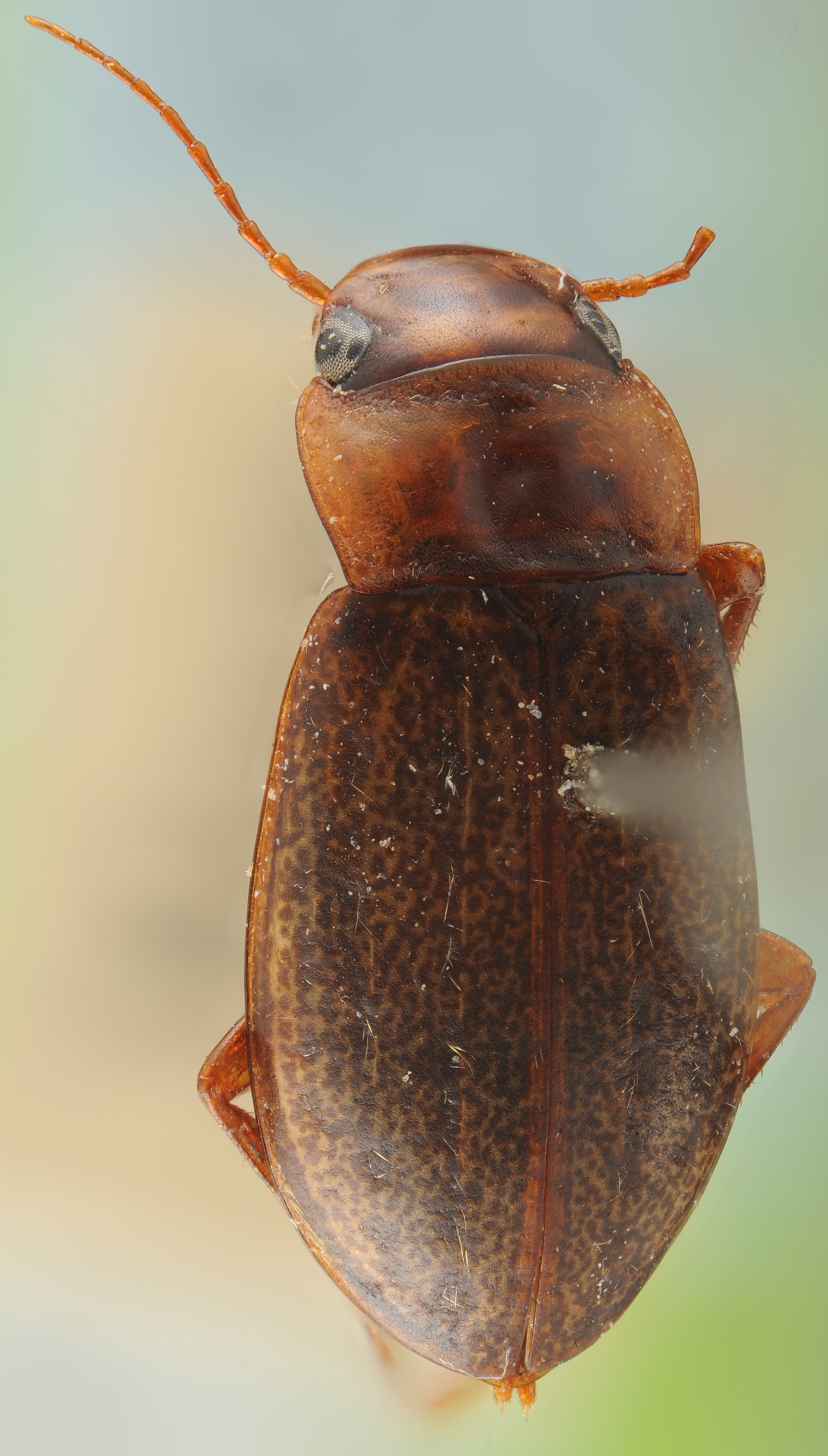

Scientific classification
- Kingdom: Animalia
- Phylum: Arthropoda
- Clade: Pancrustacea
- Class: Insecta
- Order: Coleoptera
- Suborder: Adephaga
- Family: Dytiscidae
- Subfamily: Colymbetinae
- Tribe: Colymbetini
- Genus: Anisomeria; Brinck, 1943
- Species: A. bistriata

Binomial name
- Anisomeria bistriata (Brullé, 1835)

= Anisomeria bistriata =

Species of beetle

Anisomeria bistriata is a species of beetle in the family Dytiscidae, the only species in the genus Anisomeria.
