= Rhantus dani =

Scientific classification
- Kingdom: Animalia
- Phylum: Arthropoda
- Class: Insecta
- Order: Coleoptera
- Suborder: Adephaga
- Family: Dytiscidae
- Genus: Rhantus
- Species: R. dani

Binomial name
- Rhantus dani Balke, 2001

Species of beetle

Rhantus dani is a species of predaceous diving beetle in the genus Rhantus that was described by Balke in 2001.
