= Rhantus atricolor =

Scientific classification
- Domain: Eukaryota
- Kingdom: Animalia
- Phylum: Arthropoda
- Class: Insecta
- Order: Coleoptera
- Suborder: Adephaga
- Family: Dytiscidae
- Genus: Rhantus
- Species: R. atricolor

Binomial name
- Rhantus atricolor (Aubé, 1838)

Species of beetle

Rhantus atricolor is a species of predaceous diving beetle in the family Dytiscidae. It is found in North America and the Neotropics.
