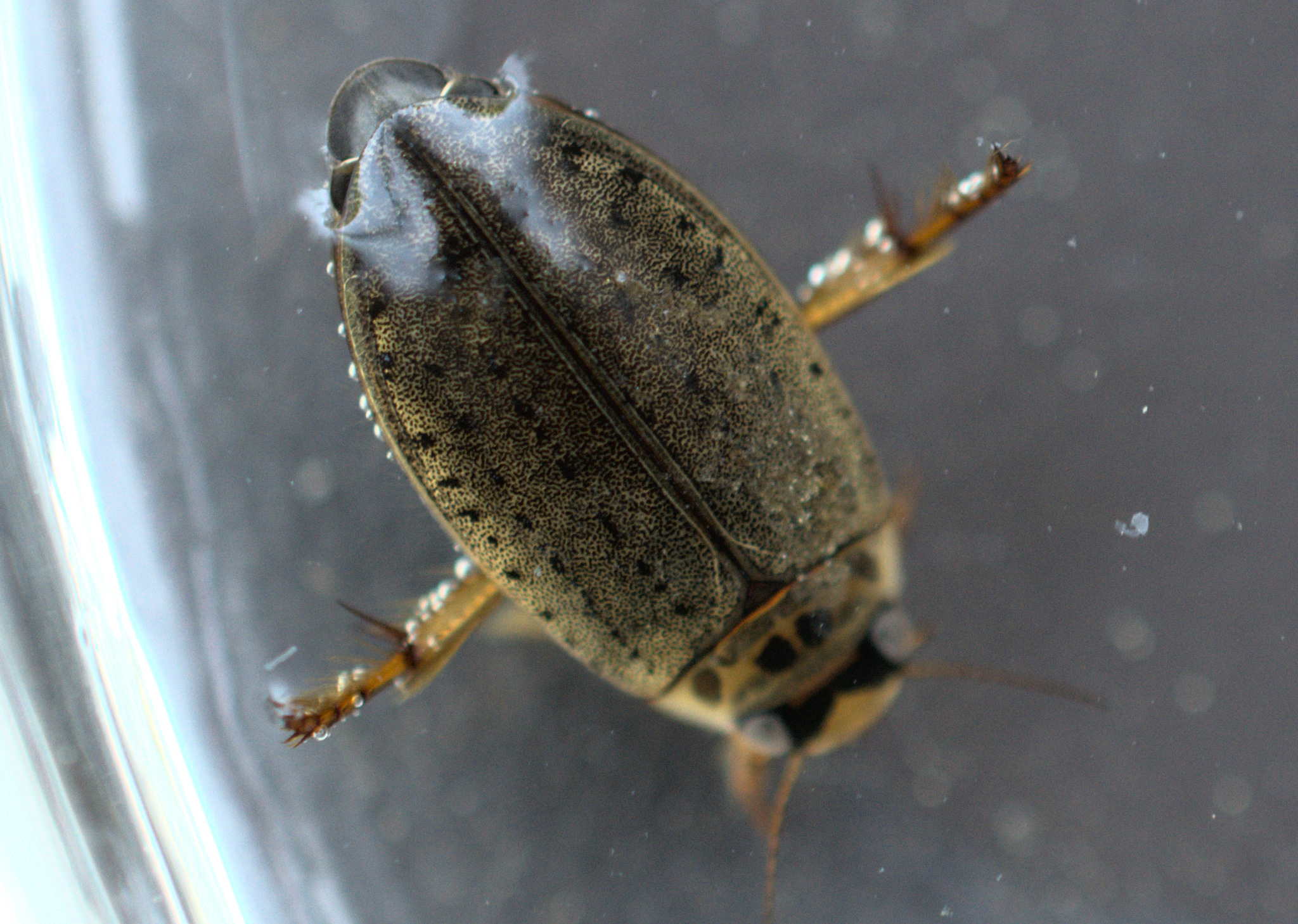

Scientific classification
- Domain: Eukaryota
- Kingdom: Animalia
- Phylum: Arthropoda
- Class: Insecta
- Order: Coleoptera
- Suborder: Adephaga
- Family: Dytiscidae
- Genus: Rhantus
- Species: R. gutticollis

Binomial name
- Rhantus gutticollis (Say, 1830)

Synonyms
- Rhantus hoppingi Wallis, 1933; Rhantus hubbelli Hatch, 1928; Rhantus maculicollis (Aubé, 1838)

= Rhantus gutticollis =

Species of beetle

Rhantus gutticollis is a species of predaceous diving beetle in the family Dytiscidae. It is found in North America and the Neotropics.
