= Rhantus taprobanicus =

Scientific classification
- Kingdom: Animalia
- Phylum: Arthropoda
- Class: Insecta
- Order: Coleoptera
- Suborder: Adephaga
- Family: Dytiscidae
- Genus: Rhantus
- Species: R. taprobanicus

Binomial name
- Rhantus taprobanicus Sharp, 1890

Species of beetle

Rhantus taprobanicus is a species of predaceous diving beetle found in India, Nepal, Pakistan and Sri Lanka.
