= Rhantus binotatus =

Scientific classification
- Domain: Eukaryota
- Kingdom: Animalia
- Phylum: Arthropoda
- Class: Insecta
- Order: Coleoptera
- Suborder: Adephaga
- Family: Dytiscidae
- Genus: Rhantus
- Species: R. binotatus

Binomial name
- Rhantus binotatus (Harris, 1828)

Synonyms
- Rhantus aequalis Hatch, 1951; Rhantus divisus (Aubé, 1838); Rhantus flavogriseus Crotch, 1873

Species of beetle

Rhantus binotatus is a species of predaceous diving beetle in the family Dytiscidae. It is found in North America.
