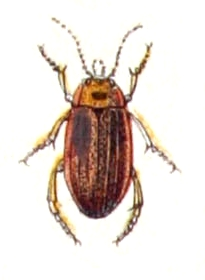

Scientific classification
- Domain: Eukaryota
- Kingdom: Animalia
- Phylum: Arthropoda
- Class: Insecta
- Order: Coleoptera
- Suborder: Adephaga
- Family: Dytiscidae
- Genus: Rhantus
- Species: R. frontalis

Binomial name
- Rhantus frontalis (Marsham, 1802)

= Rhantus frontalis =

Species of beetle

Rhantus frontalis is a species of predaceous diving beetle in the family Dytiscidae. It is found in Europe and Northern Asia (excluding China) and North America.
