= Neoscutopterus hornii =

Scientific classification
- Domain: Eukaryota
- Kingdom: Animalia
- Phylum: Arthropoda
- Class: Insecta
- Order: Coleoptera
- Suborder: Adephaga
- Family: Dytiscidae
- Genus: Neoscutopterus
- Species: N. hornii

Binomial name
- Neoscutopterus hornii (Crotch, 1873)

Species of beetle

Neoscutopterus hornii is a species of predaceous diving beetle in the family Dytiscidae. It is found in North America.
