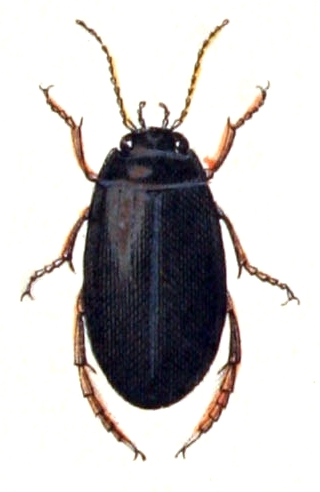
- Female M. coriacea

Scientific classification
- Kingdom: Animalia
- Phylum: Arthropoda
- Clade: Pancrustacea
- Class: Insecta
- Order: Coleoptera
- Suborder: Adephaga
- Family: Dytiscidae
- Subfamily: Colymbetinae
- Tribe: Colymbetini
- Genus: Meladema; Laporte, 1835

= Meladema =

Genus of beetles

Meladema is a genus of beetles in the family Dytiscidae. It contains the following species (among others):

- Meladema coriacea Laporte, 1835
- Meladema imbricata (Wollaston, 1871)
- Meladema lanio (Fabricius, 1775)
