= Caperhantus =

Scientific classification
- Domain: Eukaryota
- Kingdom: Animalia
- Phylum: Arthropoda
- Class: Insecta
- Order: Coleoptera
- Suborder: Adephaga
- Family: Dytiscidae
- Tribe: Colymbetini
- Genus: Caperhantus
- Species: C. cicurius

Binomial name
- Caperhantus cicurius (Fabricius, 1787)

Genus of beetles

Caperhantus is a genus of predaceous diving beetles in the family Dytiscidae. There is one described species in Caperhantus, C. cicurius. This species was formerly a member of the genus Rhantus.
