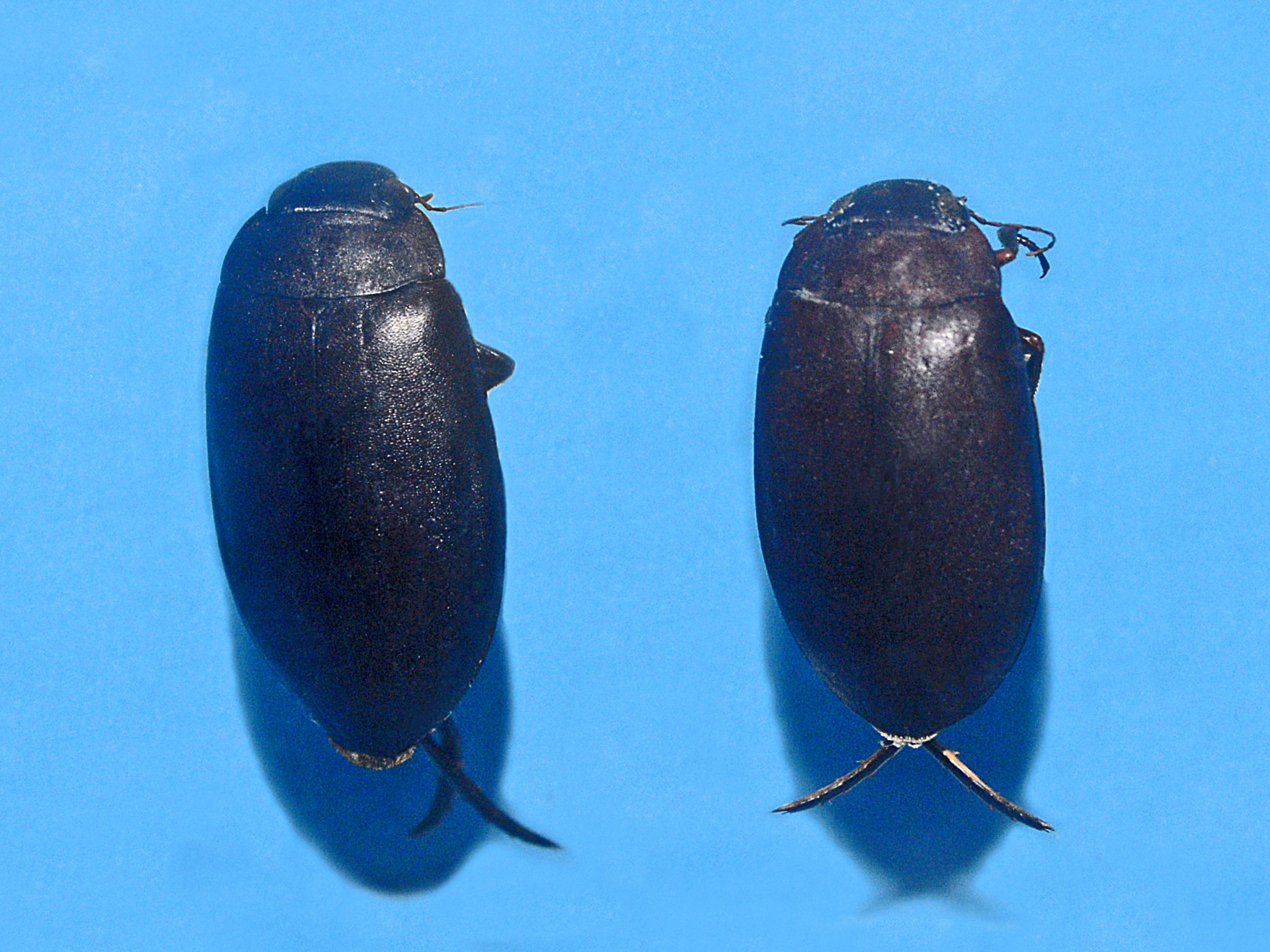
- Meladema coriacea. Museum specimen

Scientific classification
- Domain: Eukaryota
- Kingdom: Animalia
- Phylum: Arthropoda
- Class: Insecta
- Order: Coleoptera
- Suborder: Adephaga
- Family: Dytiscidae
- Genus: Meladema
- Species: M. coriacea

Binomial name
- Meladema coriacea Laporte, 1835

= Meladema coriacea =

Species of beetle

Meladema coriacea is a species of beetles belonging to the family Dytiscidae.

== Description ==
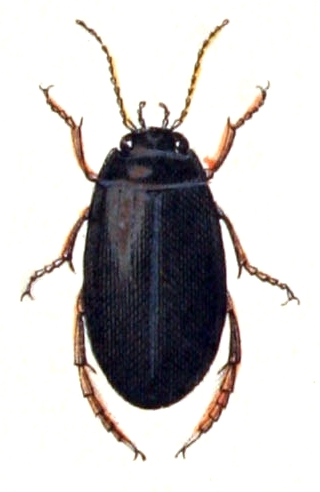
Illustration of M. coriacea from Calwer's Käferbuch

Meladema coriacea can reach a length of about 20–22 millimetres (0.79–0.87 in). The color of the body is shiny black. These water beetles have oval, flattened streamlined bodies adapted for aquatic life. Elytra have short curved striae. Antennae are reddish, and the legs are brown. The hindlegs are adapted for propelling this insect in the water. Adults can be found from April to September.

== Habitat ==
This species lives in streams, rivers and ponds.

== Distribution ==
This species is present in Bulgaria, France, Greece, Italy, Switzerland, Portugal, Spain, Near East and North Africa.
