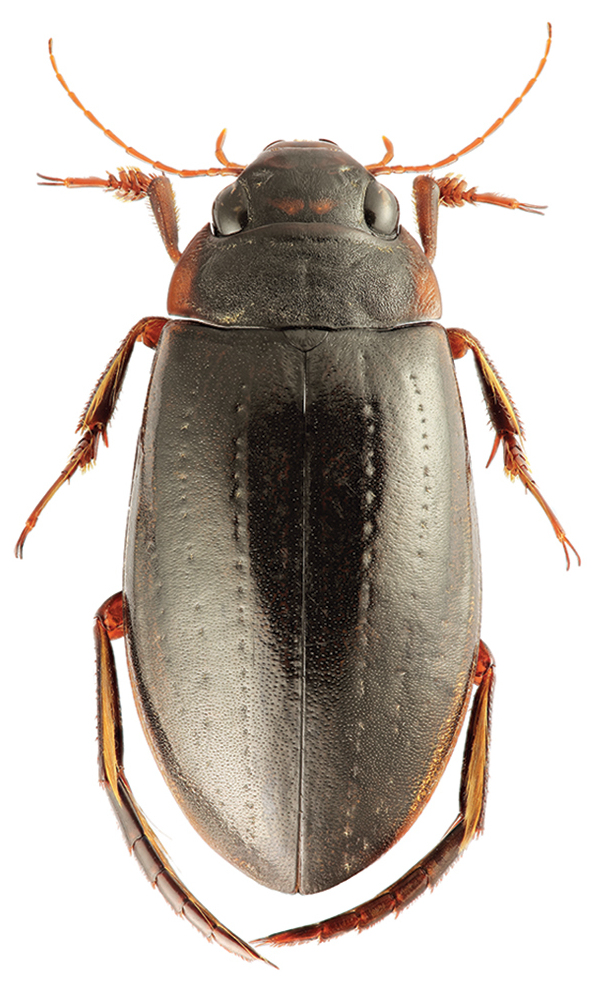

Conservation status
- Critically Endangered (IUCN 2.3)

Scientific classification
- Kingdom: Animalia
- Phylum: Arthropoda
- Class: Insecta
- Order: Coleoptera
- Suborder: Adephaga
- Family: Dytiscidae
- Genus: Meladema
- Species: M. imbricata

Binomial name
- Meladema imbricata Wollaston, 1871

= Meladema imbricata =

Species of beetle

Meladema imbricata is a species of beetle in family Dytiscidae. It is endemic to Spain.
