= Neoscutopterus angustus =

Scientific classification
- Domain: Eukaryota
- Kingdom: Animalia
- Phylum: Arthropoda
- Class: Insecta
- Order: Coleoptera
- Suborder: Adephaga
- Family: Dytiscidae
- Genus: Neoscutopterus
- Species: N. angustus

Binomial name
- Neoscutopterus angustus (LeConte, 1850)

Species of beetle

Neoscutopterus angustus is a species of predaceous diving beetle in the family Dytiscidae. It is found in North America.
