= Rhantus tigris =

Scientific classification
- Kingdom: Animalia
- Phylum: Arthropoda
- Class: Insecta
- Order: Coleoptera
- Suborder: Adephaga
- Family: Dytiscidae
- Genus: Rhantus
- Species: R. tigris

Binomial name
- Rhantus tigris Balke, 1995

Species of beetle

Rhantus tigris is a species of water beetle in the family Dytiscidae. It was described in 1995 by Michael Balke. It is known from Assam, India. It measures about 14 mm (0.55 in) in length.
