= Rhantus wallisi =

Scientific classification
- Domain: Eukaryota
- Kingdom: Animalia
- Phylum: Arthropoda
- Class: Insecta
- Order: Coleoptera
- Suborder: Adephaga
- Family: Dytiscidae
- Genus: Rhantus
- Species: R. wallisi

Binomial name
- Rhantus wallisi Hatch, 1953

Species of beetle

Rhantus wallisi is a species of predaceous diving beetle in the family Dytiscidae. It is found in North America.
