= Rhantus interclusus =

Scientific classification
- Kingdom: Animalia
- Phylum: Arthropoda
- Class: Insecta
- Order: Coleoptera
- Suborder: Adephaga
- Family: Dytiscidae
- Genus: Rhantus
- Species: R. interclusus

Binomial name
- Rhantus interclusus (Walker, 1858)

Synonyms
- Colymbetes interclusus Walker, 1858

Species of beetle

Rhantus interclusus is a species of predaceous diving beetle found in Sri Lanka.
