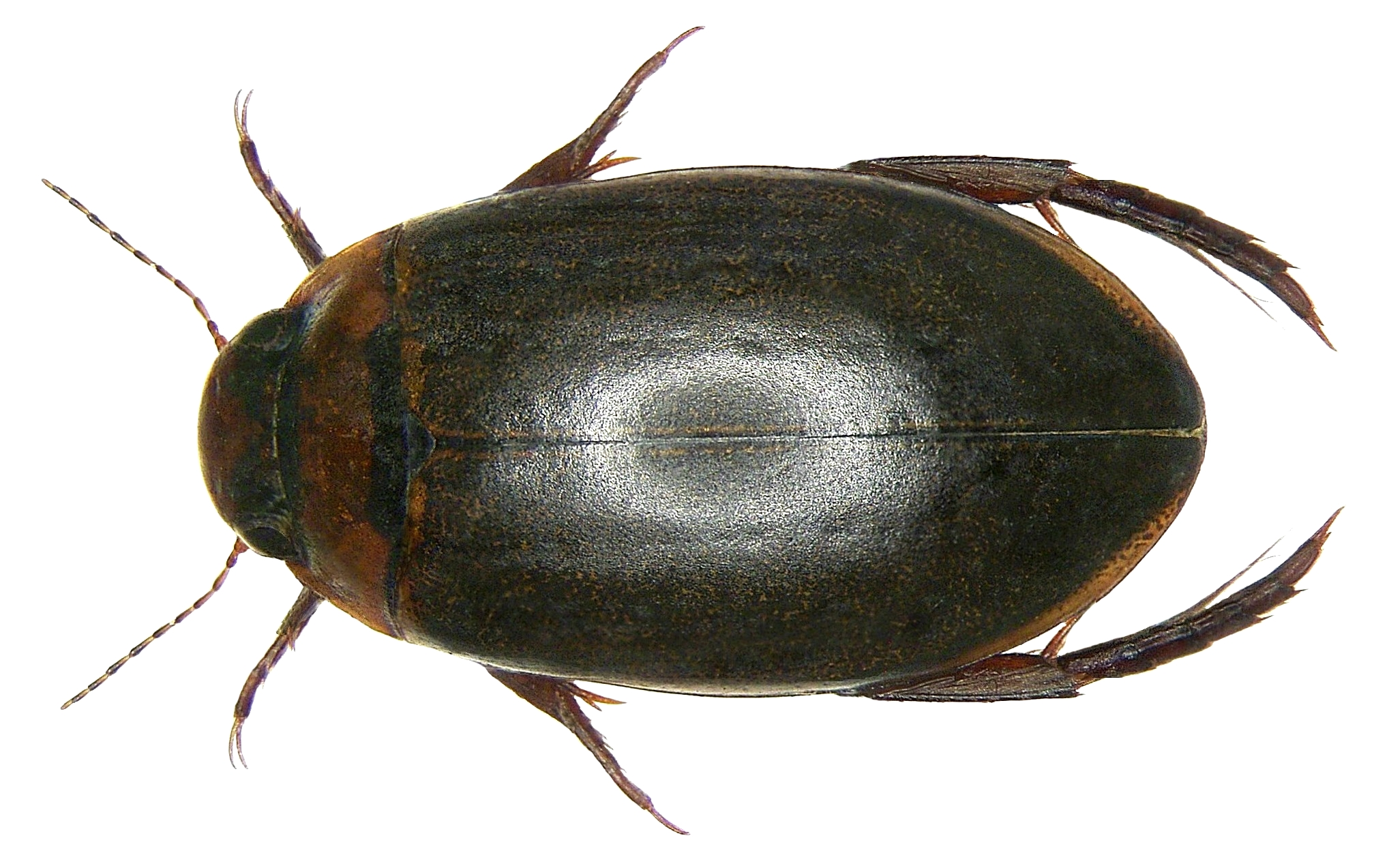

Scientific classification
- Domain: Eukaryota
- Kingdom: Animalia
- Phylum: Arthropoda
- Class: Insecta
- Order: Coleoptera
- Suborder: Adephaga
- Family: Dytiscidae
- Genus: Rhantus
- Species: R. suturellus

Binomial name
- Rhantus suturellus (Harris, 1828)

Synonyms
- Agabus subopacus Mannerheim, 1853; Rhantus zimmermanni Wallis, 1933

= Rhantus suturellus =

Species of beetle

Rhantus suturellus is a species of predaceous diving beetle in the family Dytiscidae. It is found in North America and the Palearctic.
