= Rhantus consimilis =

Scientific classification
- Kingdom: Animalia
- Phylum: Arthropoda
- Class: Insecta
- Order: Coleoptera
- Suborder: Adephaga
- Family: Dytiscidae
- Genus: Rhantus
- Species: R. consimilis

Binomial name
- Rhantus consimilis Motschulsky, 1859

Synonyms
- Rhantus discedens Sharp, 1882; Rhantus tostus (LeConte, 1866)

Species of beetle

Rhantus consimilis is a species of predaceous diving beetle in the family Dytiscidae. It is found in North America.
