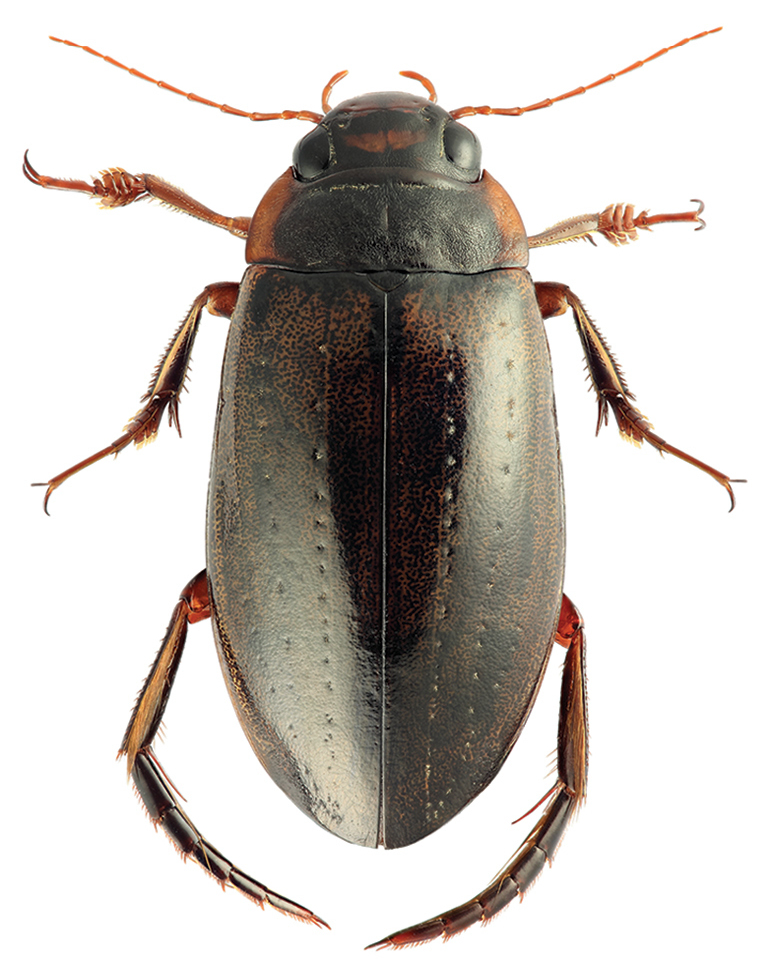

Conservation status
- Vulnerable (IUCN 2.3)

Scientific classification
- Kingdom: Animalia
- Phylum: Arthropoda
- Class: Insecta
- Order: Coleoptera
- Suborder: Adephaga
- Family: Dytiscidae
- Genus: Meladema
- Species: M. lanio

Binomial name
- Meladema lanio Falkenstrom, 1938

= Meladema lanio =

Species of beetle

Meladema lanio is a species of beetle in family Dytiscidae. It is endemic to Portugal.
