= Melanodytes =

Scientific classification
- Domain: Eukaryota
- Kingdom: Animalia
- Phylum: Arthropoda
- Class: Insecta
- Order: Coleoptera
- Suborder: Adephaga
- Family: Dytiscidae
- Subfamily: Colymbetinae
- Tribe: Colymbetini
- Genus: Melanodytes; Seidlitz, 1887
- Species: M. pustulatus

Binomial name
- Melanodytes pustulatus (Rossi, 1792)

Genus of beetles

Melanodytes is a genus of predaceous diving beetles in the family Dytiscidae. This genus has a single species, Melanodytes pustulatus, found in Europe and northern Asia.
