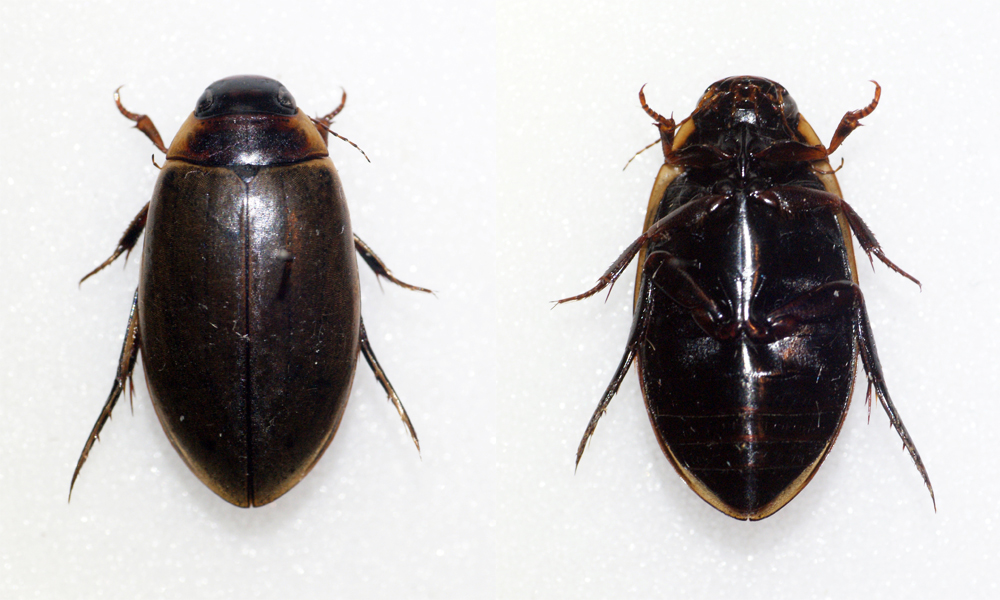

Scientific classification
- Domain: Eukaryota
- Kingdom: Animalia
- Phylum: Arthropoda
- Class: Insecta
- Order: Coleoptera
- Suborder: Adephaga
- Family: Dytiscidae
- Genus: Rhantus
- Species: R. suturalis

Binomial name
- Rhantus suturalis (W.S. Macleay, 1825)

= Rhantus suturalis =

Species of beetle

Rhantus suturalis, commonly known as the supertramp beetle or cosmopolitan diving beetle, is a species of diving beetle (Dytiscidae) with a cosmopolitan distribution.

== Description ==
Adult Rhantus suturalis range from 10.5 to 13.0 mm in length. The head is black with a pale anterior margin and a pale marking between the eyes, and the antennae and palps are also pale. The pronotum is pale with a usually well-defined dark mark in the middle. The elytra are pale brown and covered in fine punctures. The sternites of the abdomen are completely black. The legs are brown and often have the metatibiae and metatarsi darker. Males differ from females in the basal tarsomeres of the prolegs and midlegs being weakly dilated, and the protarsal claws being unequal and much shorter than the terminal tarsomere.

In Europe, R. suturalis coexists with the also-common species R. exsoletus, but that species has a vague black posterior margin to the pronotum instead of a central dark mark, and its abdominal sternites are yellow instead of black. In Australia, the only other Rhantus species is R. simulans, which is larger (12.8-13.5 mm) and only found in the country's southwest, unlike the more widespread R. suturalis.

Larvae are typical for larvae of Dytiscidae, with a flat head, crescent-shaped jaws and a segmented body. The legs are partially fringed with hairs, used in swimming. The end of the abdomen has a pair of cerci which are covered in setae. Fully grown larvae are about 15 mm long.

Pupae are covered in stiff hairs. These hairs keep the rest of the pupa off the mud of the pupation cell (see the "Life cycle" section below), which may help it avoid fungal infection and keep the surrounding air fresh.

== Life cycle ==
Breeding occurs in spring and early summer, with eggs being deposited among submerged debris. Larvae emerge a few days later. The larval stage lasts three weeks and involves three instars. Towards the end of the larval stage, larvae become temporarily inactive, then leave the water to dig a cell in which pupation occurs. The pupal stage may only last a few days, but adults remain inside the cell for a while longer to become pigmented and harden their exoskeletons. Finally, less than two weeks after the digging of the pupation cell, adults emerge.

Adults are present throughout the year. They are believed to overwinter in the water. In milder climates, they may remain active throughout the winter.

== Habitat ==
These beetles typically occur in small water bodies with little or no vegetation. They may be found in garden ponds, temporary pools, flooded tyre ruts, water butts and brackish water ponds.

== Diet ==
Adults and larvae are both predators whose preferred prey is mosquito larvae. Additionally, larvae can be cannibalistic.

Midge larvae and water fleas have also been described as prey of R. suturalis.

== Gallery ==
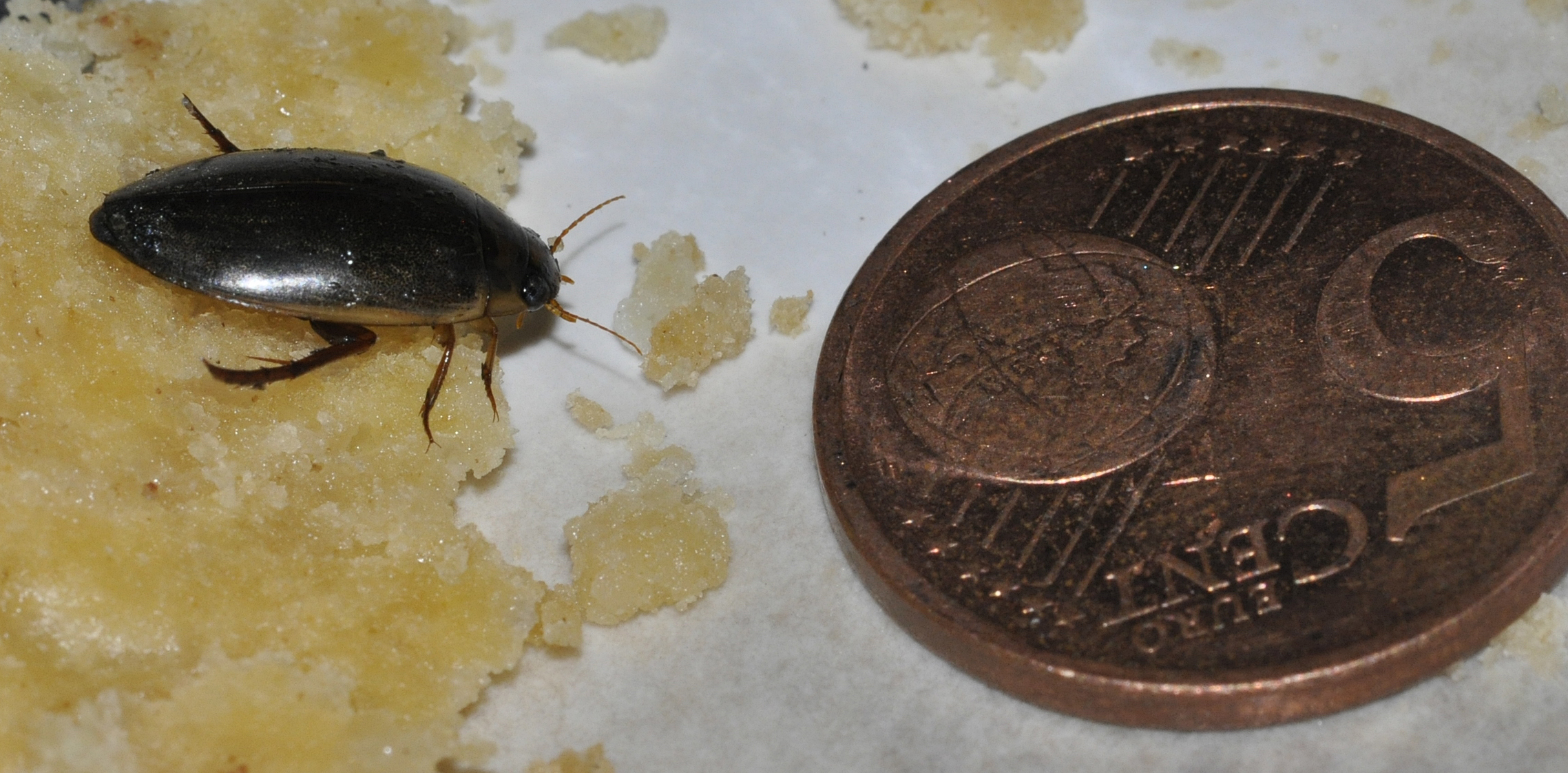

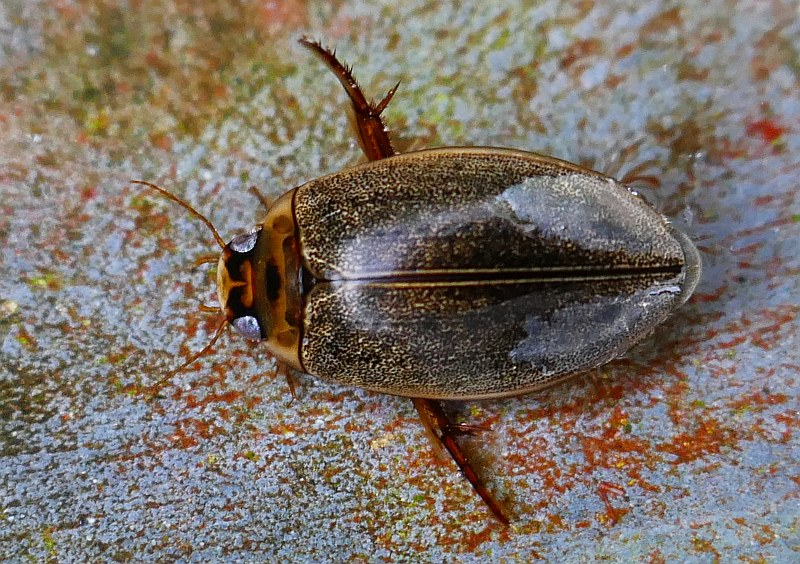

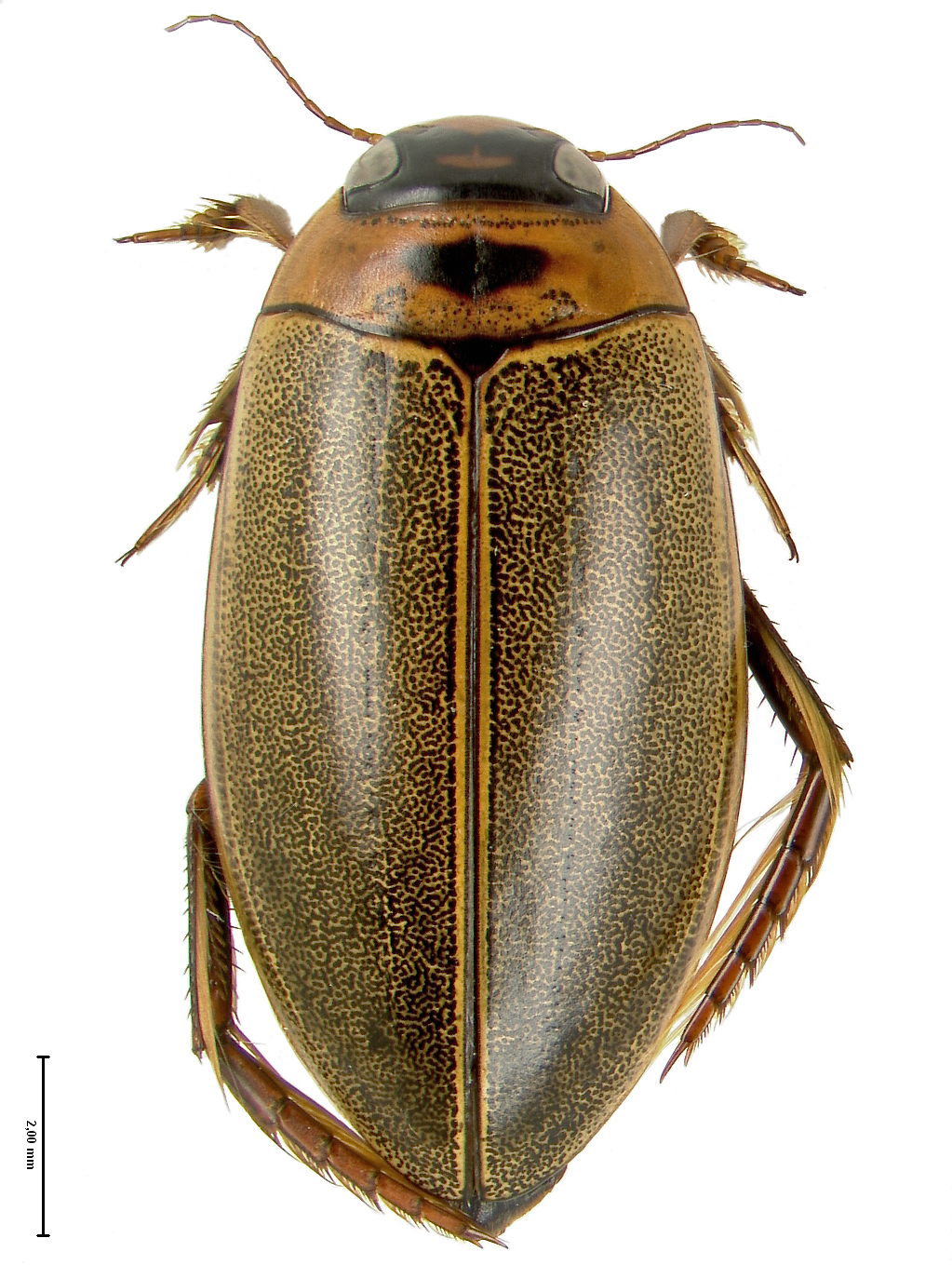
