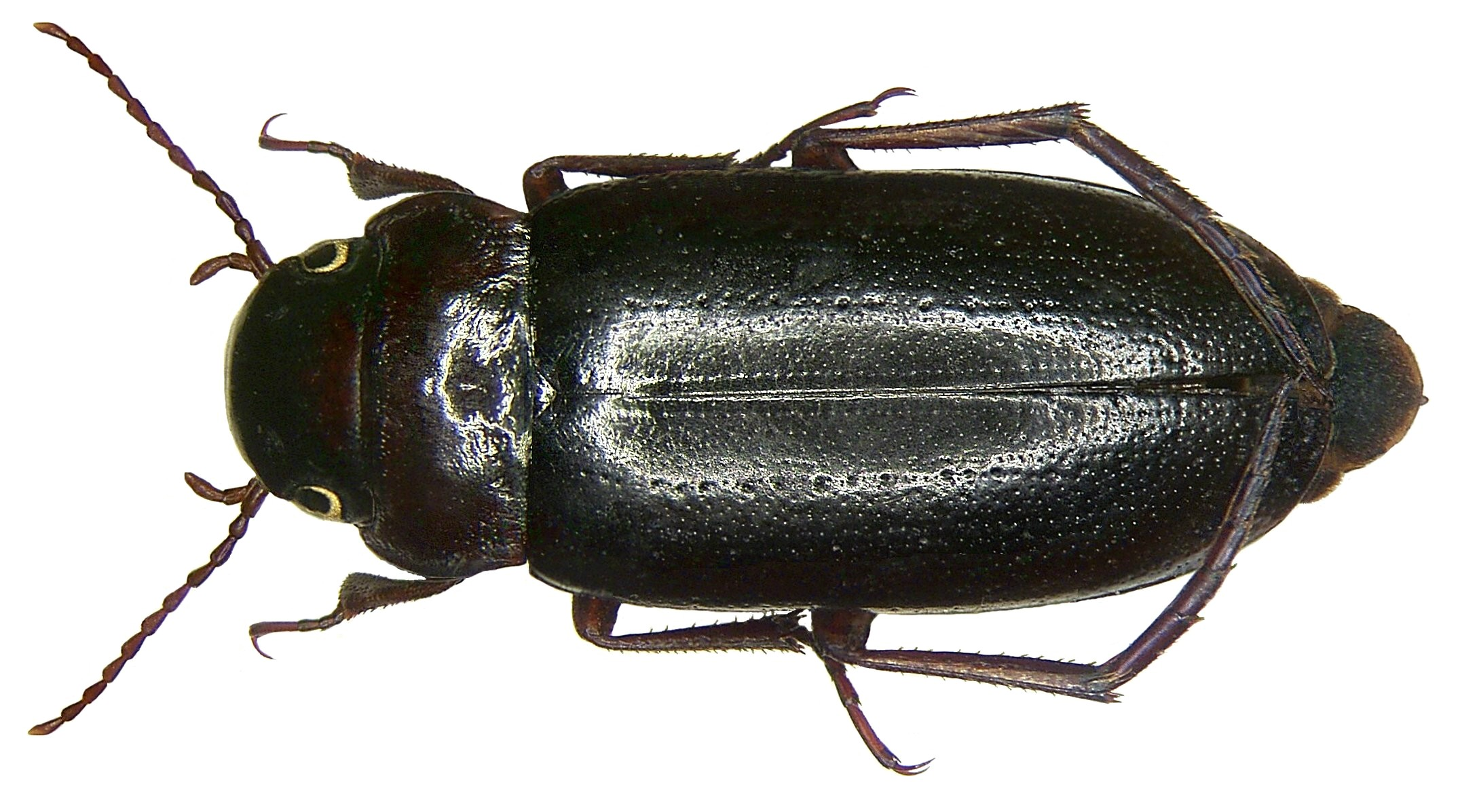
- Carabdytes upin

Scientific classification
- Kingdom: Animalia
- Phylum: Arthropoda
- Class: Insecta
- Order: Coleoptera
- Suborder: Adephaga
- Family: Dytiscidae
- Subfamily: Colymbetinae
- Tribe: Colymbetini
- Genus: Carabdytes; Balke, Hendrich & Wewalka, 1992

= Carabdytes =

Genus of beetles

Carabdytes is a genus of predaceous diving beetles in the family Dytiscidae. Carabdytes upin was formerly the sole species of this genus, but nine species in the genus Rhantus were transferred to Carabdytes as a result of research published by Balke et al. in 2017.

== Species ==
These 10 species belong to the genus Carabdytes:

- Carabdytes alutaceus (Fauvel, 1883)
- Carabdytes guadalcanalensis (Balke, 1998)
- Carabdytes monteithi (Balke, Wewalka, Alarie & Ribera, 2007)
- Carabdytes novaecaledoniae (Balfour-Browne, 1944)
- Carabdytes oceanicus (Balke, 1993)
- Carabdytes pacificus (Boisduval, 1835)
- Carabdytes plantaris (Sharp, 1882)
- Carabdytes poellerbauerae (Balke, Wewalka, Alarie & Ribera, 2007)
- Carabdytes pseudopacificus (Balke, 1993)
- Carabdytes upin Balke, Hendrich & Wewalka 1992
