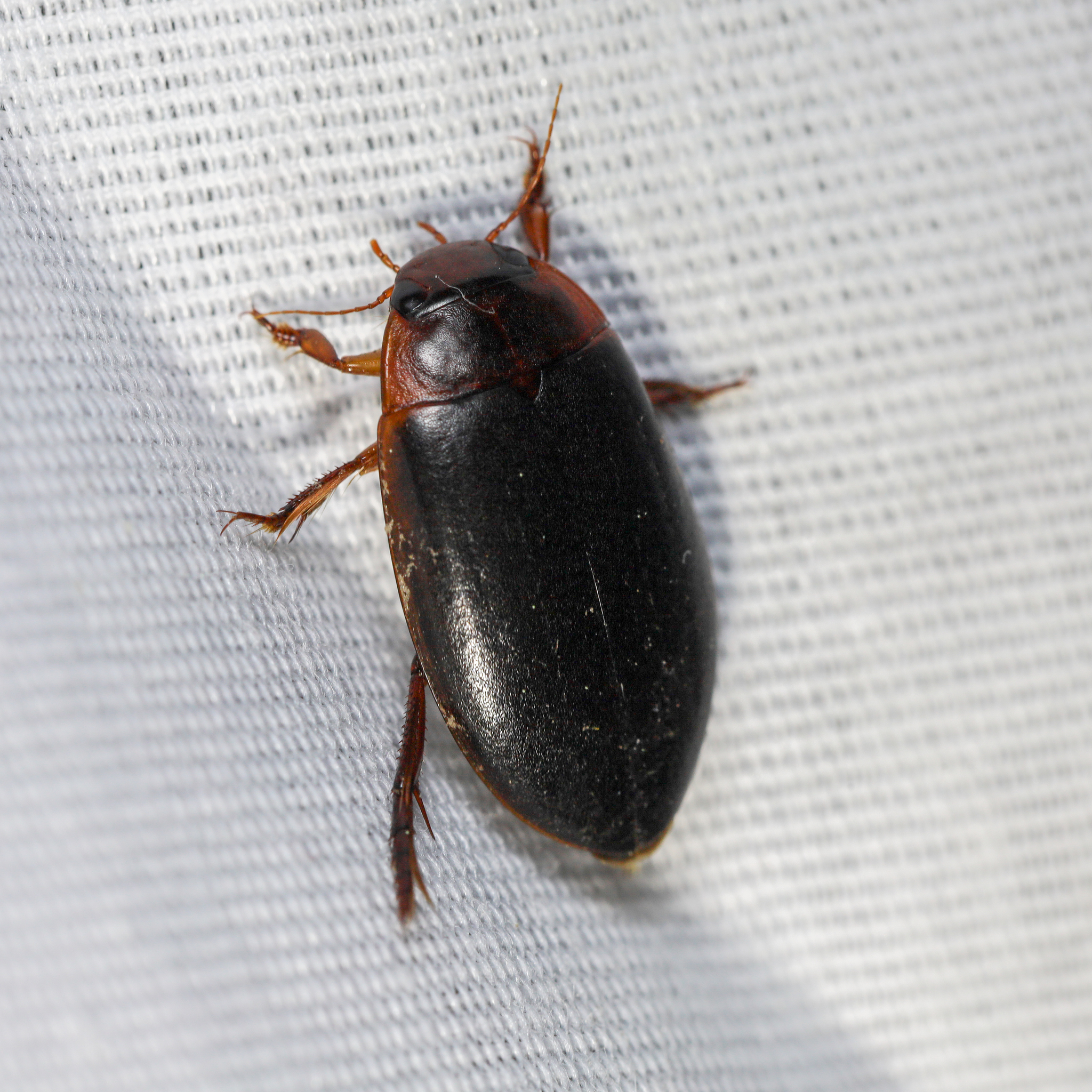
- Hoperius planatus, Maryland

Scientific classification
- Domain: Eukaryota
- Kingdom: Animalia
- Phylum: Arthropoda
- Class: Insecta
- Order: Coleoptera
- Suborder: Adephaga
- Family: Dytiscidae
- Tribe: Colymbetini
- Genus: Hoperius; Fall, 1927
- Species: H. planatus

Binomial name
- Hoperius planatus Fall, 1927

= Hoperius =

Genus of beetles

Hoperius is a genus of predaceous diving beetles in the family Dytiscidae. This genus has a single species, Hoperius planatus. It is found in the United States east of the Rocky Mountains.
