= Senilites =

Senilites tristanicola

Scientific classification
- Kingdom: Animalia
- Phylum: Arthropoda
- Class: Insecta
- Order: Coleoptera
- Suborder: Adephaga
- Family: Dytiscidae
- Genus: Senilites; Brinck, 1948
- Species: S. tristanicola

Binomial name
- Senilites tristanicola Brinck, 1948

Genus of beetles

Senilites tristanicola is a species of beetle in the family Dytiscidae, the only species in the genus Senilites.
