= Neoscutopterus =

Scientific classification
- Kingdom: Animalia
- Phylum: Arthropoda
- Class: Insecta
- Order: Coleoptera
- Suborder: Adephaga
- Family: Dytiscidae
- Tribe: Colymbetini
- Genus: Neoscutopterus; J.Balfour-Browne, 1943

Genus of beetles

Neoscutopterus is a genus of beetles in the family Dytiscidae, containing the following species:

- Neoscutopterus angustus (LeConte, 1850)
- Neoscutopterus hornii (Crotch, 1873)
