= Bunites =

Bunites distigma

Scientific classification
- Kingdom: Animalia
- Phylum: Arthropoda
- Class: Insecta
- Order: Coleoptera
- Suborder: Adephaga
- Family: Dytiscidae
- Genus: Bunites; Spangler, 1972
- Species: B. distigma

Binomial name
- Bunites distigma (Brullé, 1837)

Genus of beetles

Bunites distigma is a species of beetles in the family Dytiscidae, the only species in the genus Bunites.
