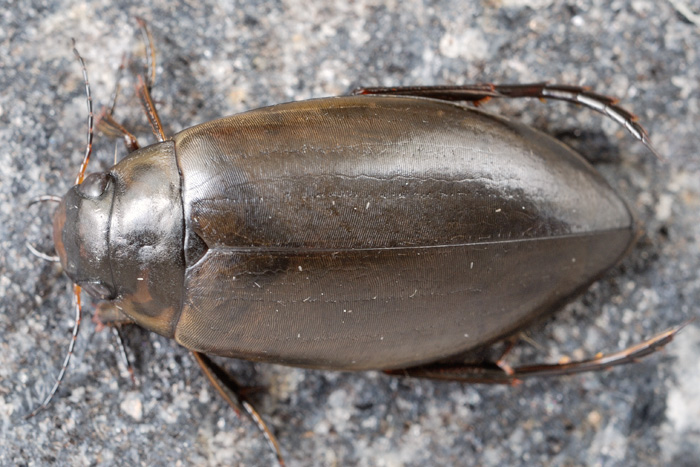
- Colymbetes paykulli

Scientific classification
- Kingdom: Animalia
- Phylum: Arthropoda
- Class: Insecta
- Order: Coleoptera
- Suborder: Adephaga
- Family: Dytiscidae
- Subfamily: Colymbetinae
- Tribe: Colymbetini; Erichson, 1837

= Colymbetini =

Tribe of beetles

Colymbetini is a tribe of predaceous diving beetles in the family Dytiscidae. There are about 11 genera and more than 160 described species in Colymbetini.

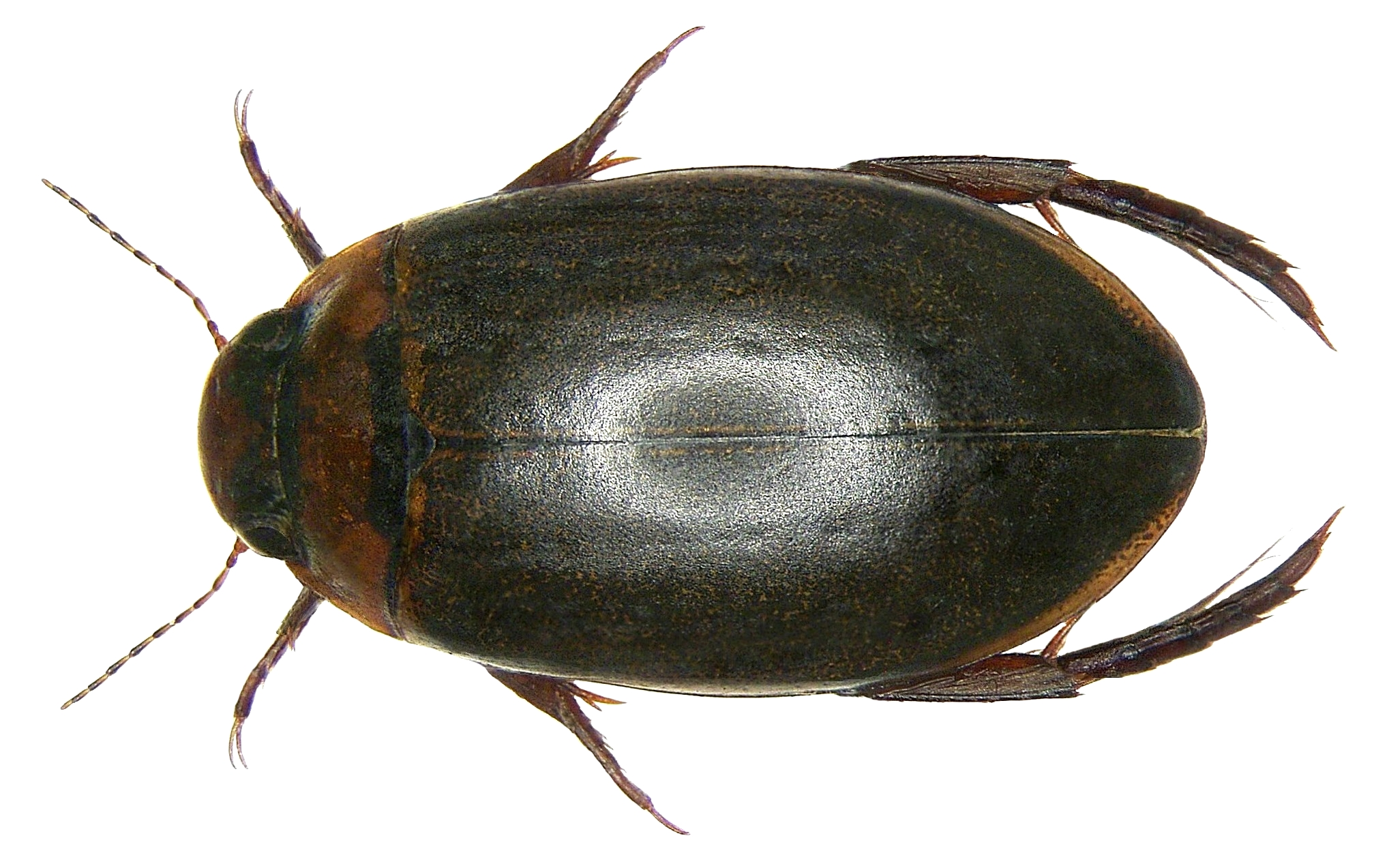
Rhantus suturellus

== Genera ==
These 11 genera belong to the tribe Colymbetini:

- Bunites Spangler, 1972
- Caperhantus
- Carabdytes Balke, Hendrich & Wewalka, 1992
- Colymbetes Clairville, 1806
- Hoperius Fall, 1927
- Meladema Laporte, 1835
- Melanodytes Seidlitz, 1887
- Meridiorhantus Balke, Hajek & Hendrich, 2017
- Nartus
- Neoscutopterus J. Balfour-Browne, 1943
- Rhantus Dejean, 1833
