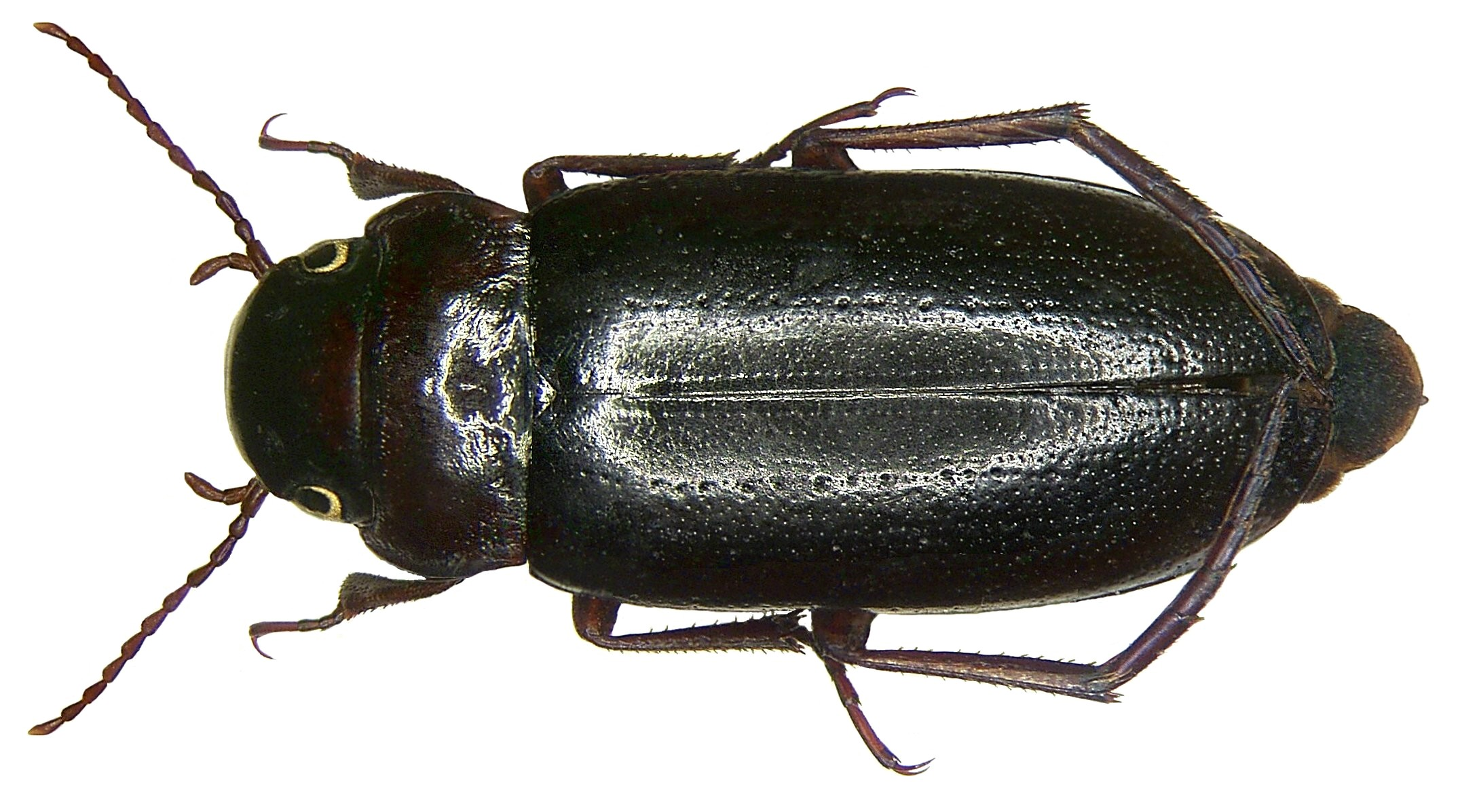
- Carabdytes upin

Scientific classification
- Kingdom: Animalia
- Phylum: Arthropoda
- Class: Insecta
- Order: Coleoptera
- Suborder: Adephaga
- Family: Dytiscidae
- Subfamily: Colymbetinae; Erichson, 1837

= Colymbetinae =

Colymbetinae Temporal range: Late Cretaceous–Now

Subfamily of beetles

Colymbetinae is a subfamily of predaceous diving beetles in the family Dytiscidae. There are about 11 genera and at least 130 described species in Colymbetinae.

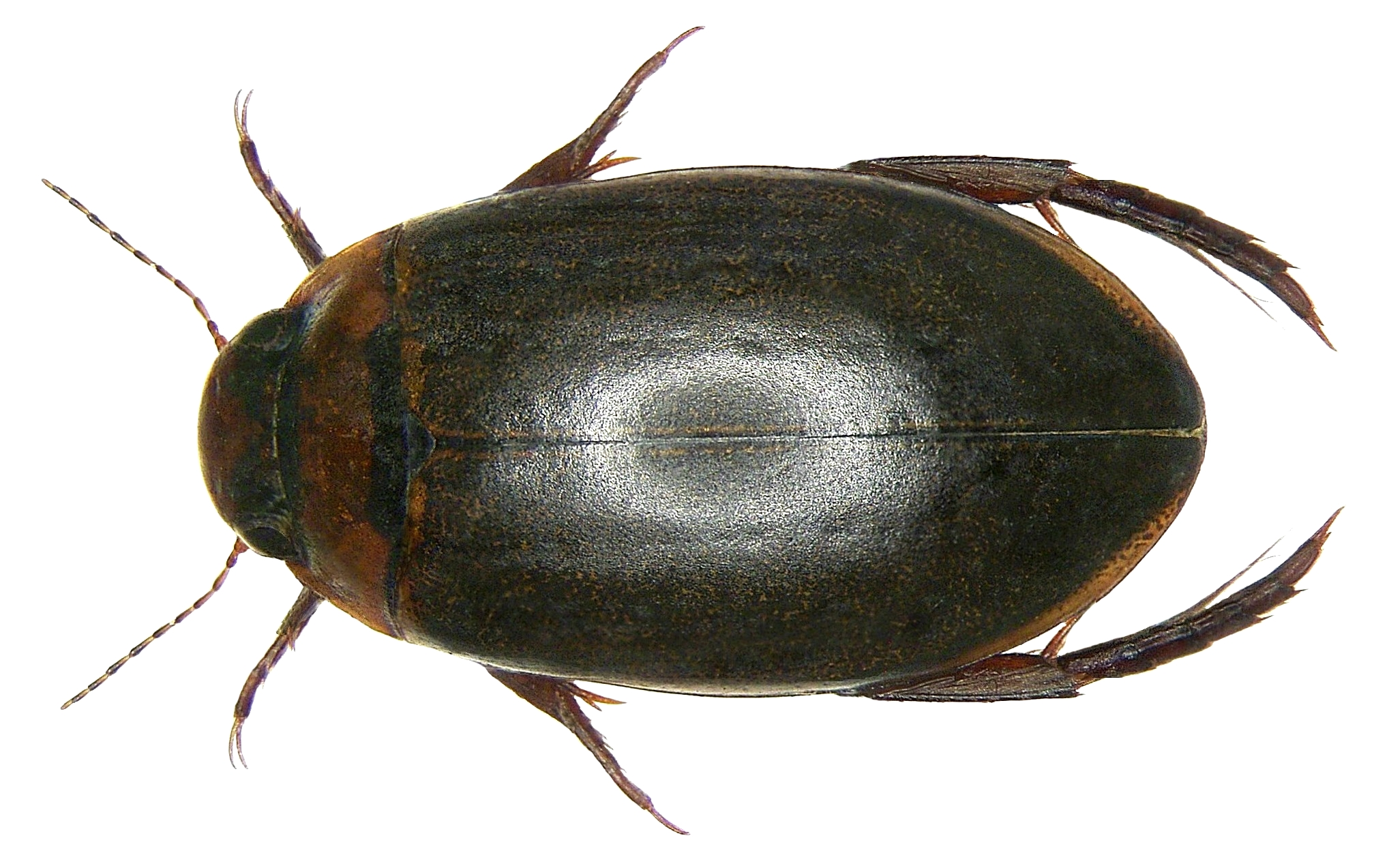
Rhantus suturellus

== Genera ==
These 11 genera belong to the subfamily Colymbetinae:

- Anisomeria Brinck, 1943^{i c g}
- Bunites Spangler, 1972^{i c g}
- Carabdytes Balke, Hendrich and Wewalka, 1992^{i c g}
- Colymbetes Clairville, 1806^{i c g b}
- Hoperius Fall, 1927^{i c g b}
- Meladema Laporte, 1835^{i c g}
- Melanodytes Seidlitz, 1887^{i c g}
- Neoscutopterus J. Balfour-Browne, 1943^{i c g b}
- Rhantus Dejean, 1833^{i c g b}
- Rugosus García, 2001^{i c g}
- Senilites Brinck, 1948^{i c g}

Data sources: i = ITIS, c = Catalogue of Life, g = GBIF, b = Bugguide.net
