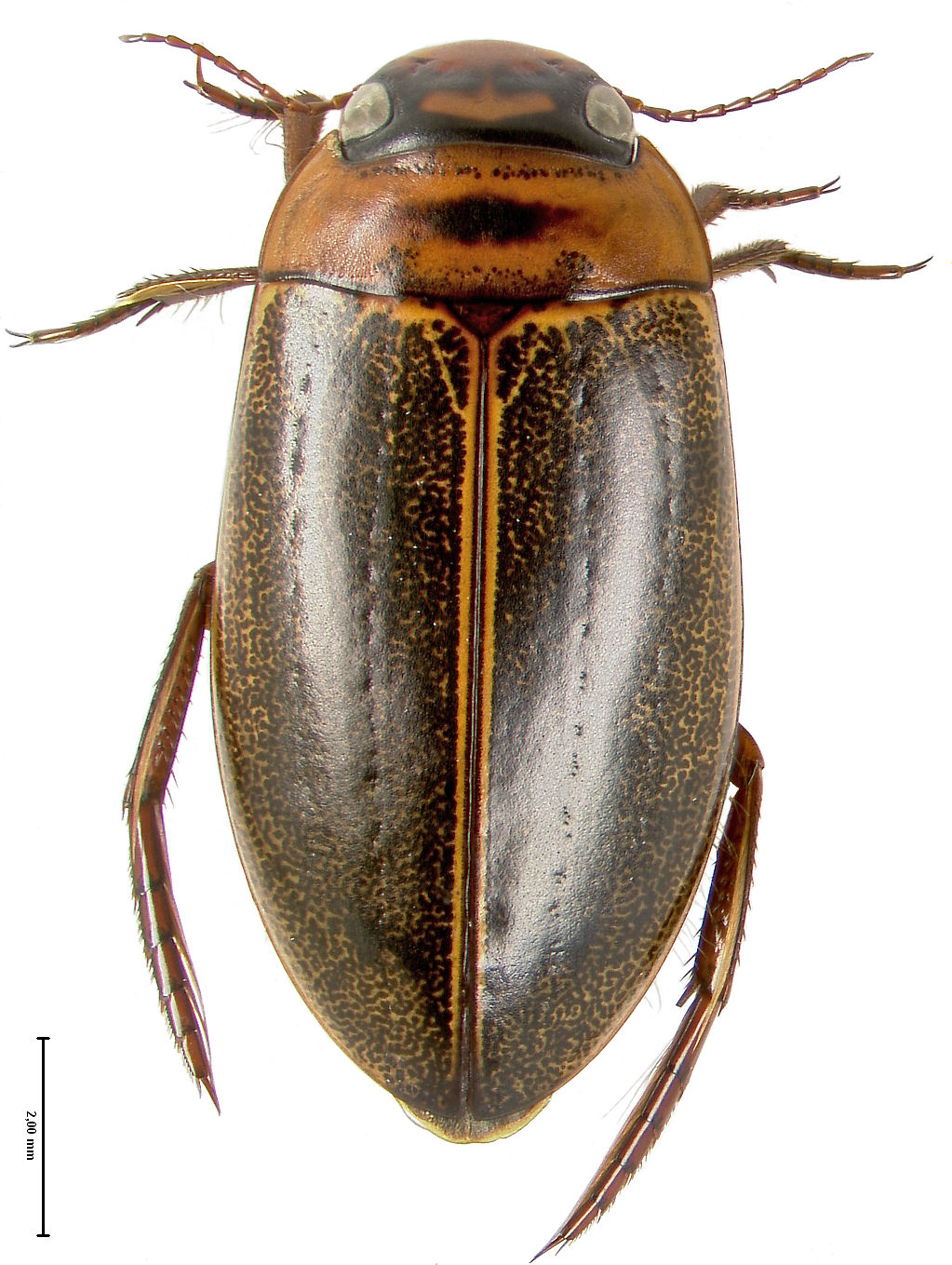
- Rhantus elisabethae

Scientific classification
- Kingdom: Animalia
- Phylum: Arthropoda
- Class: Insecta
- Order: Coleoptera
- Suborder: Adephaga
- Family: Dytiscidae
- Subfamily: Colymbetinae
- Tribe: Colymbetini
- Genus: Rhantus; Dejean, 1833

Species
- See text

= Rhantus =

Genus of beetle

Rhantus is a genus of beetle in family Dytiscidae. There are about 100 species distributed worldwide. They often live in pools and marshy habitat types. Several species have colonized oceanic islands and become endemics.

This genus is paraphyletic and will likely be revised, redefined, and split into several groups in future studies. As a result of research published in 2017 by Balke et al., 17 species were moved from Rhantus to the genera Nartus, Meridiorhantus, Caperhantus, and Carabdytes.

== Species ==
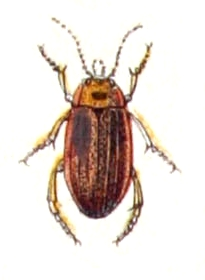
male Rhantus frontalis

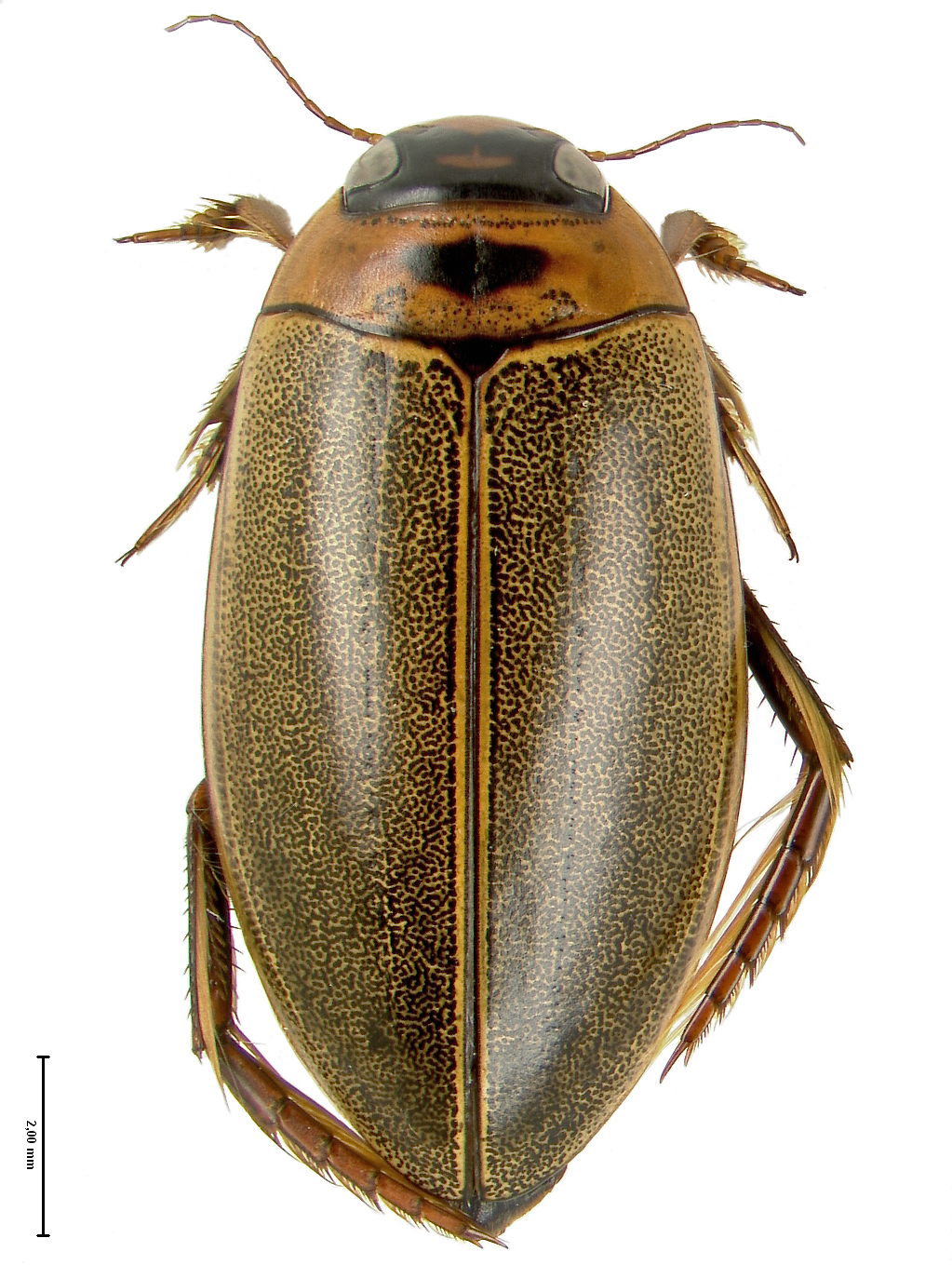
Rhantus suturalis

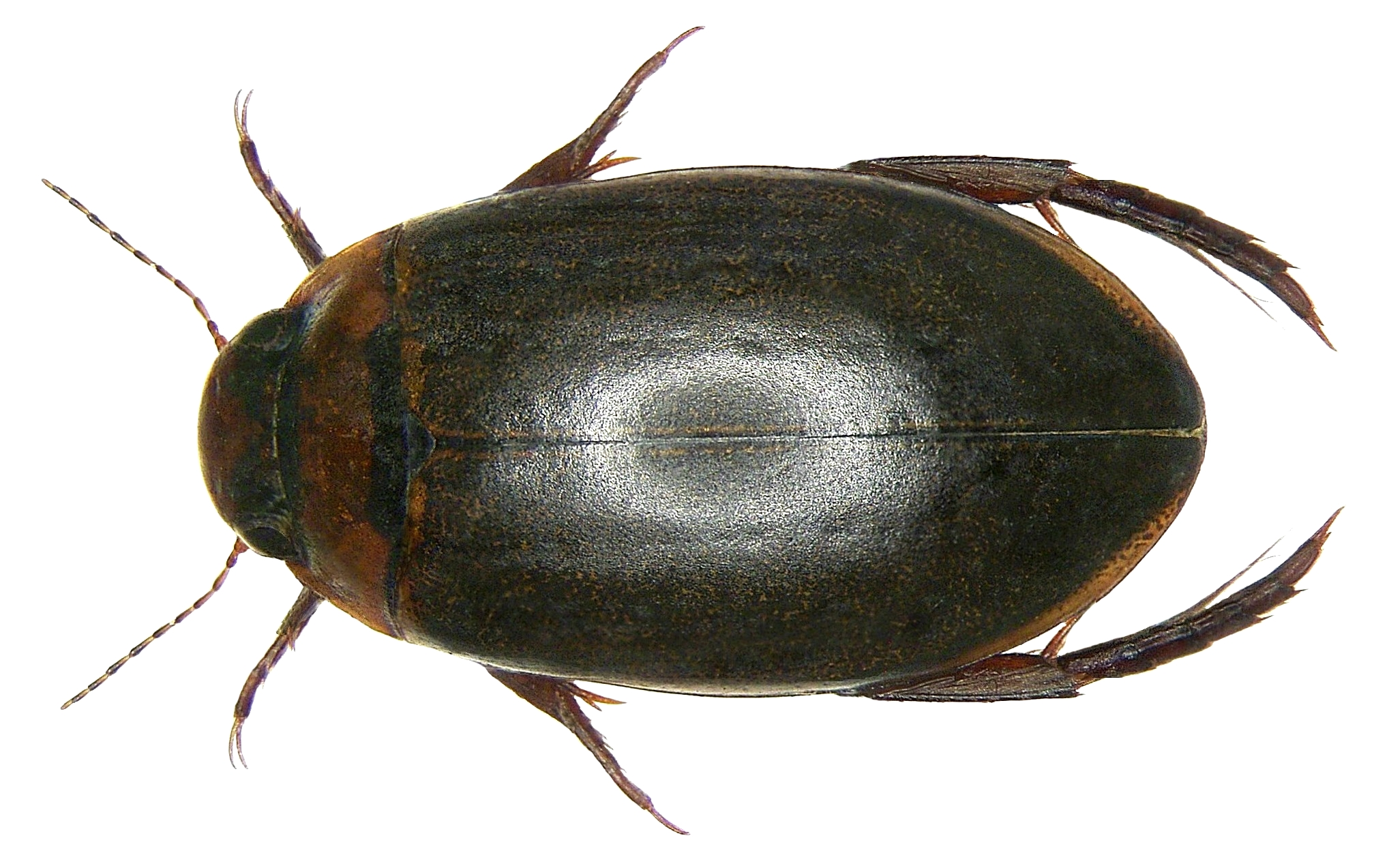
Rhantus suturellus

These species belong to the genus Rhantus:

- Rhantus advena Sharp, 1882
- Rhantus alluaudi Peschet, 1910
- Rhantus andinus Balke, 1998
- Rhantus anggi Balke, 2001
- Rhantus anisonychus Crotch, 1873
- Rhantus annectens Sharp, 1882
- Rhantus atricolor (Aubé, 1838)
- Rhantus bacchusi Balke, 2001
- Rhantus binotatus (Harris, 1828)
- Rhantus bistriatus (Bergsträsser, 1778)
- Rhantus blancasi Guignot, 1955
- Rhantus bohlei Balke, Roughley, Sondermann & Spangler, 2002
- Rhantus bouvieri Régimbart, 1900
- Rhantus bula Balke, Wewalka, Alarie & Ribera, 2007
- Rhantus calileguai Trémouilles, 1984
- Rhantus capensis (Aubé, 1838)
- Rhantus cheesmanae Balke, 1993
- Rhantus colymbitoides Gschwendtner, 1932
- Rhantus concolorans (Wallengren, 1881)
- Rhantus consimilis Motschulsky, 1859
- Rhantus consputus (Sturm, 1834)
- Rhantus crypticus Balke, 1992
- Rhantus dani Balke, 2001
- Rhantus debilis Sharp, 1882
- Rhantus discicollis (Aubé, 1838)
- Rhantus duponti (Aubé, 1838)
- Rhantus ekari Balke & Hendrich, 1992
- Rhantus elegans C.O. Waterhouse, 1895
- Rhantus elisabethae Balke, Kinibel & Sagata, 2007
- Rhantus englundi Balke & Ramsdale, 2006
- Rhantus erraticus Sharp, 1884
- Rhantus exsoletus (Forster, 1771)
- Rhantus fengi Zhao, Jia & Balke, 2011
- Rhantus fennicus Huldén, 1982
- Rhantus formosanus Kamiya, 1938
- Rhantus franzi Balke, 1998
- Rhantus friedrichi Falkenström, 1936
- Rhantus frontalis (Marsham, 1802)
- Rhantus galapagoensis Balke & Peck, 1993
- Rhantus gogonensis Wewalka, 1975
- Rhantus gutticollis (Say, 1830)
- Rhantus hiekei Balke, 1993
- Rhantus hispanicus Sharp, 1882
- Rhantus includens (Walker, 1871)
- Rhantus incognitus Scholz, 1927
- Rhantus interclusus (Walker, 1858)
- Rhantus intermedius Balke, 1993
- Rhantus kakapupu Balke, 2001
- Rhantus kini Balke, Wewalka, Alarie & Ribera, 2007
- Rhantus latitans Sharp, 1882
- Rhantus latus (Fairmaire, 1869)
- Rhantus leuser Balke, 1998
- Rhantus liopteroides Zimmermann, 1927
- Rhantus longulus Régimbart, 1895
- Rhantus manjakatompo Pederzani & Rocchi, 2009
- Rhantus notaticollis (Aubé, 1837)
- Rhantus obscuricollis (Aubé, 1838)
- Rhantus ovalis Gschwendtner, 1936
- Rhantus papuanus J. Balfour-Browne, 1939
- Rhantus pederzanii Toledo & Mazzoldi, 1996
- Rhantus peruvianus Guignot, 1955
- Rhantus phocaenarum Guignot, 1957
- Rhantus riedeli Balke, 2001
- Rhantus rohani Peschet, 1924
- Rhantus rufus Zimmermann, 1922
- Rhantus rugulosus Régimbart, 1899
- Rhantus schauinslandi Ordish, 1989
- Rhantus schereri Balke, 1990
- Rhantus selkirki Jäch, Balke & Michat, 2014
- Rhantus sericans Sharp, 1882
- Rhantus sexualis Zimmermann, 1919
- Rhantus signatus (Fabricius, 1775)
- Rhantus sikkimensis Régimbart, 1899
- Rhantus simulans Régimbart, 1908
- Rhantus socialis (C.O. Waterhouse, 1876)
- Rhantus souzannae Balke, 1990
- Rhantus supranubicus Balke, 2001
- Rhantus suturalis (W.S. Macleay, 1825)
- Rhantus suturellus (Harris, 1828)
- Rhantus taprobanicus Sharp, 1890
- Rhantus thibetanus Régimbart, 1899
- Rhantus tigris Balke, 1995
- Rhantus tristanicola (Brinck, 1948)
- Rhantus vermiculatus Motschulsky, 1860
- Rhantus vicinus (Aubé, 1838)
- Rhantus vinsoni Balke, 1992
- Rhantus vitiensis J. Balfour-Browne, 1944
- Rhantus wallisi Hatch, 1953
- Rhantus wittei Gschwendtner, 1938
- Rhantus yessoensis Sharp, 1891
- † Rhantus praesuturellus Nomnicki, 1894
