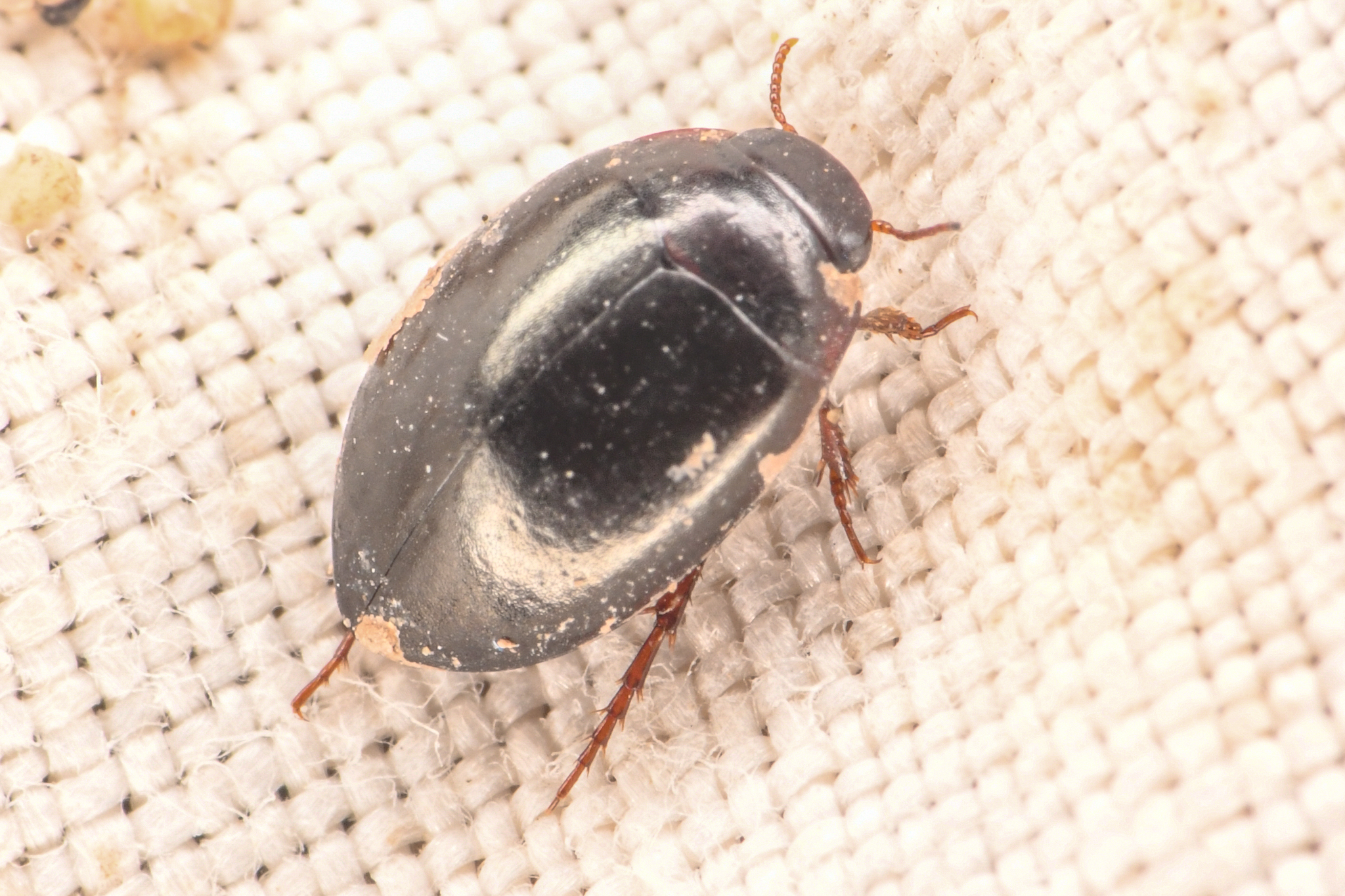
- Hydrotrupes palpalis

Scientific classification
- Kingdom: Animalia
- Phylum: Arthropoda
- Clade: Pancrustacea
- Class: Insecta
- Order: Coleoptera
- Suborder: Adephaga
- Family: Dytiscidae
- Subfamily: Agabinae
- Tribe: Hydrotrupini; Roughley, 2000

Type genus
- Hydrotrupes Sharp, 1882

= Hydrotrupini =

Tribe of beetles

Hydrotrupini is a tribe of beetle in the family Dytiscidae.

== Genera ==
As of 2023, the following genera are included:

- Andonectes Guéorguiev, 1971
- Hydrotrupes Sharp, 1882
- Platynectes Régimbart, 1879

Leuronectes and Agametrus have been merged with Platynectes.
