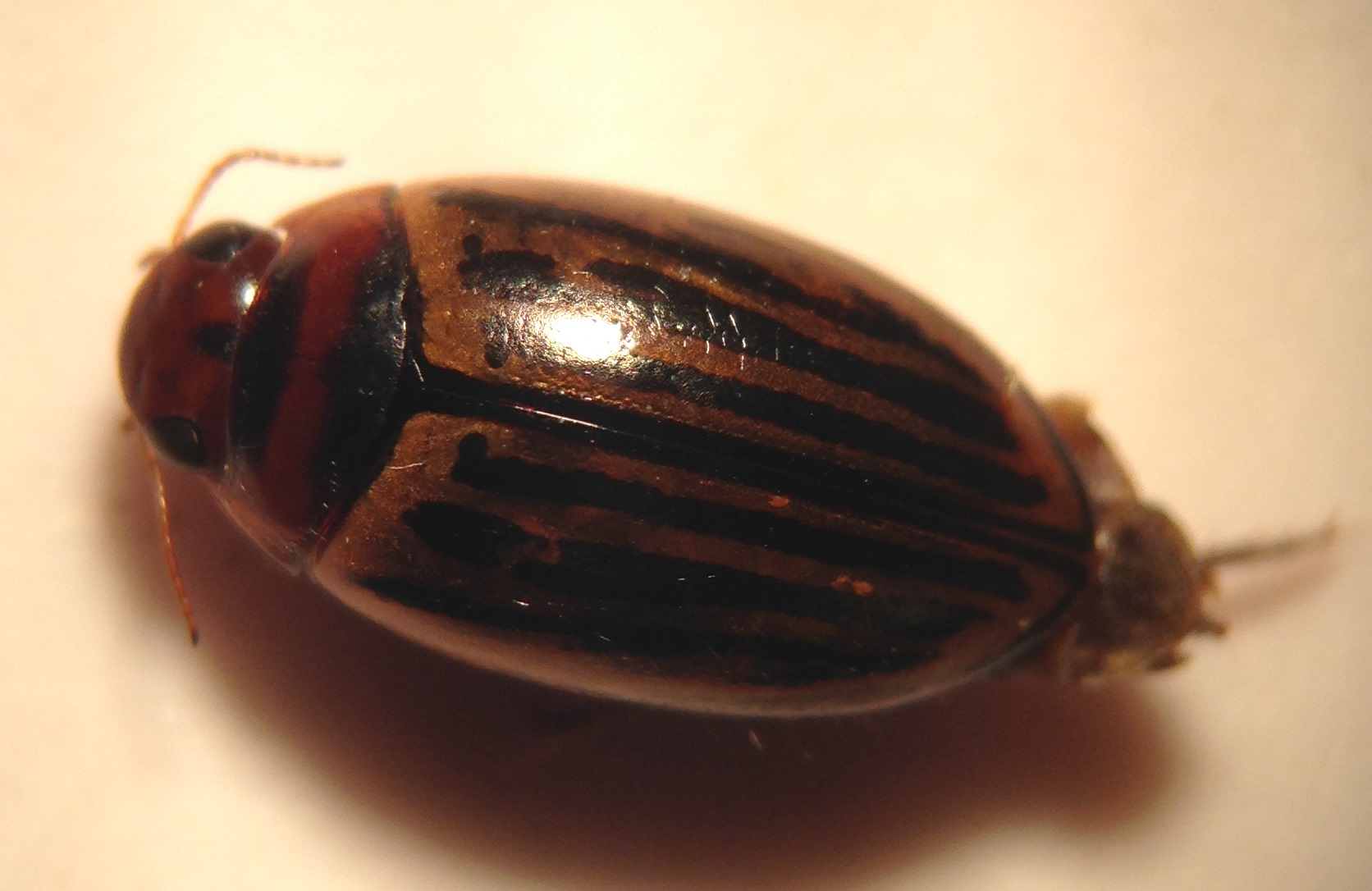
- Agabus disintegratus

Scientific classification
- Kingdom: Animalia
- Phylum: Arthropoda
- Clade: Pancrustacea
- Class: Insecta
- Order: Coleoptera
- Suborder: Adephaga
- Family: Dytiscidae
- Subfamily: Agabinae; Thomson, 1867

Tribes
- Agabini; Hydrotrupini

Synonyms
- Hydrotrupinae Roughley in Larson, Alarie and Roughley, 2000

= Agabinae =

Subfamily of beetles

Agabinae is a subfamily of predaceous diving beetles in the family Dytiscidae. There are 9 extant genera and more than 460 described species in Agabinae.

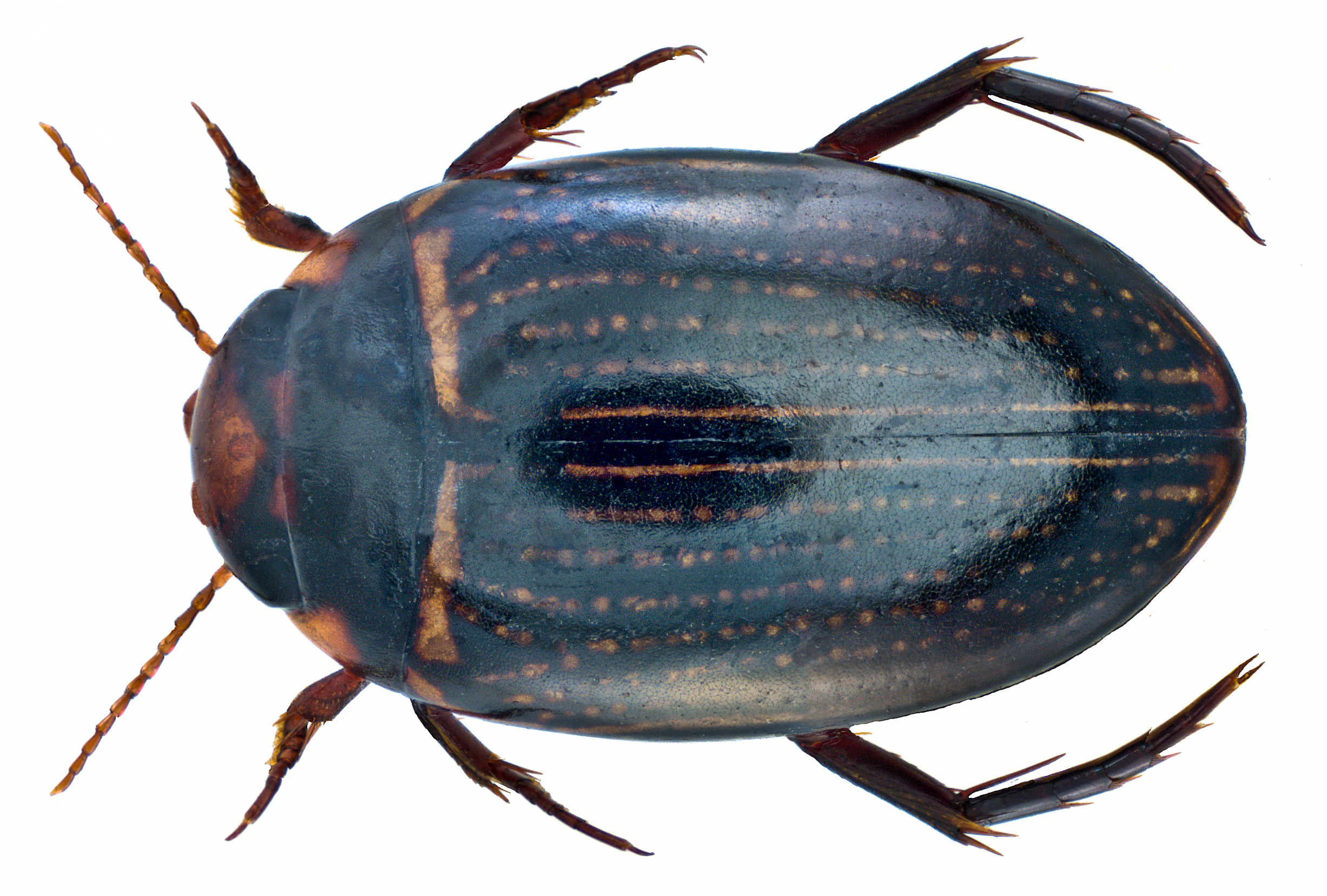
Platynectes kashmiranus

== Genera ==
These 9 genera belong to the subfamily Agabinae:

Tribe: Agabini Thomson, 1867

- Agabinus Crotch, 1873
- Agabus Leach, 1817
- Hydronebrius Jakovlev, 1897
- Ilybiosoma Crotch, 1873
- Ilybius Erichson, 1832
- Platambus Thomson, 1859

Tribe: Hydrotrupini Roughley, 2000

- Andonectes Guéorguiev, 1971
- Hydrotrupes Sharp, 1882
- Platynectes Régimbart, 1879

Leuronectes and Agametrus have been merged with Platynectes.
