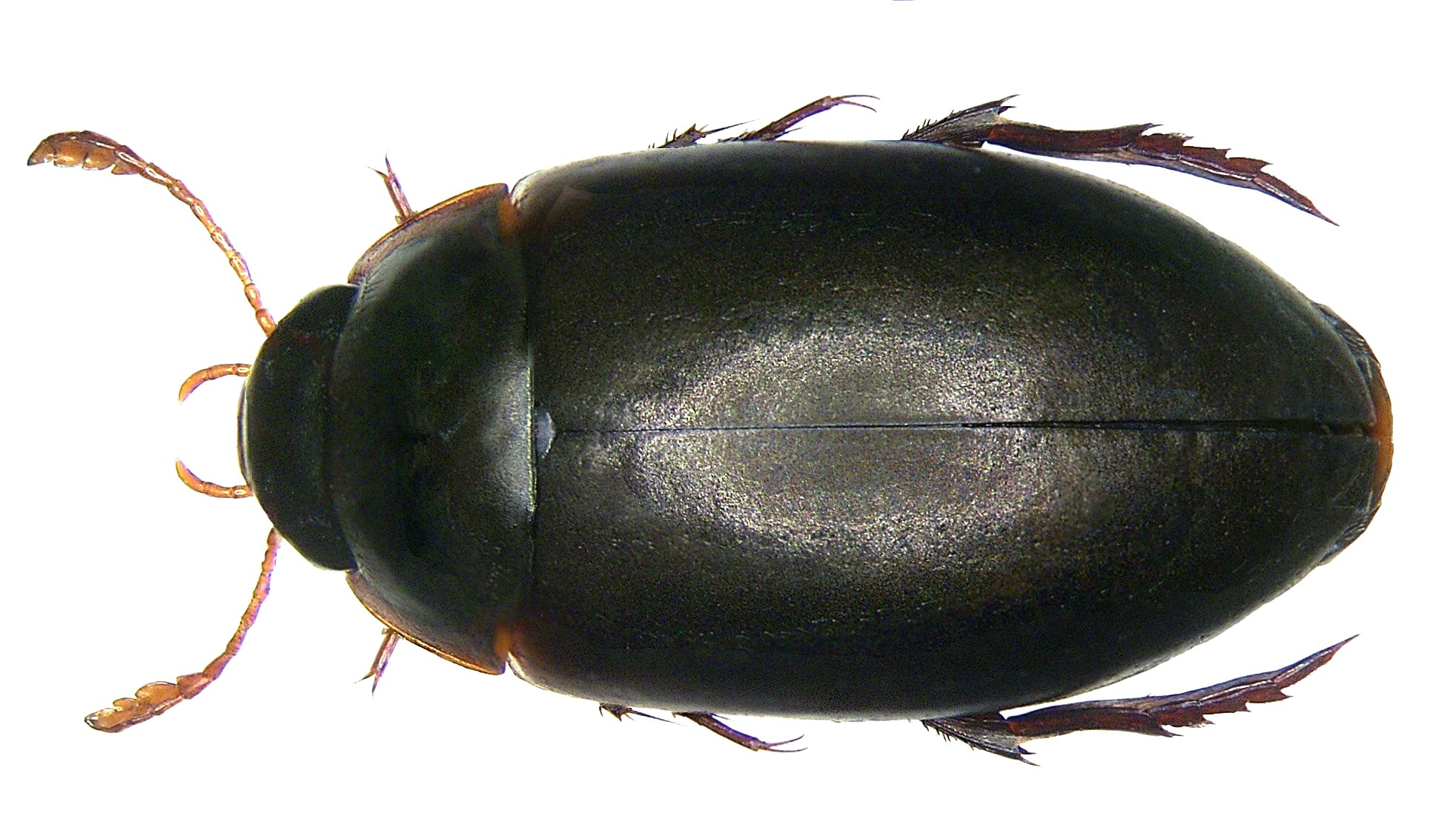
- Agabus serricornis

Scientific classification
- Kingdom: Animalia
- Phylum: Arthropoda
- Clade: Pancrustacea
- Class: Insecta
- Order: Coleoptera
- Suborder: Adephaga
- Family: Dytiscidae
- Subfamily: Agabinae
- Tribe: Agabini; Thomson, 1867

Type genus
- Agabus Leach, 1817

= Agabini =

Tribe of beetles

Agabini is a tribe of beetles in the family Dytiscidae.

== Genera ==
As of 2023, the following genera are included:

- Agabinus Crotch, 1873
- Agabus Leach, 1817
- Hydronebrius Jakovlev, 1897
- Ilybiosoma Crotch, 1873
- Ilybius Erichson, 1832
- Platambus Thomson, 1859
