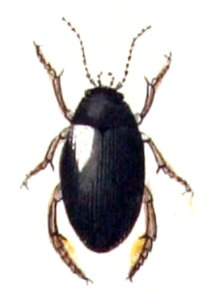
- Ilybius ater

Scientific classification
- Domain: Eukaryota
- Kingdom: Animalia
- Phylum: Arthropoda
- Class: Insecta
- Order: Coleoptera
- Suborder: Adephaga
- Family: Dytiscidae
- Genus: Ilybius
- Species: I. ater

Binomial name
- Ilybius ater (De Geer, 1774)

= Ilybius ater =

Species of beetle

Ilybius ater is a species of beetle native to the Palearctic, including Europe, and the Near East.

In Europe, it is found in Albania, Austria, Belarus, Belgium, Bosnia and Herzegovina, Bulgaria, the Channel Islands, Croatia, the Czech Republic, mainland Denmark, Estonia, Finland, mainland France, Germany, Great Britain including the Isle of Man, mainland Greece, Hungary, the Republic of Ireland, mainland Italy, Kaliningrad, Latvia, Liechtenstein, Lithuania, Luxembourg, Northern Ireland, mainland Norway, Poland, Russia, Slovakia, Slovenia, Sweden, Switzerland, the Netherlands, and Ukraine.
