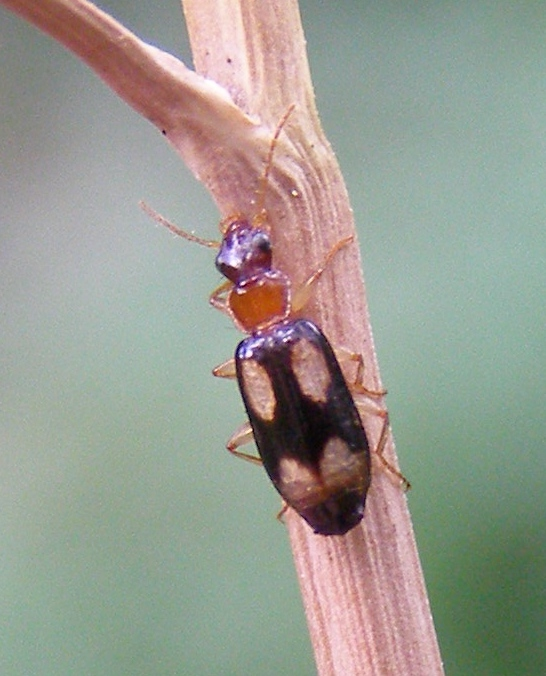

Scientific classification
- Kingdom: Animalia
- Phylum: Arthropoda
- Clade: Pancrustacea
- Class: Insecta
- Order: Coleoptera
- Suborder: Adephaga
- Family: Carabidae
- Genus: Dromius
- Species: D. quadrimaculatus

Binomial name
- Dromius quadrimaculatus (Linnaeus, 1758)

= Dromius quadrimaculatus =

Species of beetle

Dromius quadrimaculatus is a species of ground beetle native to the Palearctic (including Europe) and the Near East. In Europe, it is found in Austria, Belarus, Belgium, Bosnia and Herzegovina, Bulgaria, Corsica, the Czech Republic, mainland Denmark, Estonia, Finland, mainland France, Germany, Great Britain including the Isle of Man, mainland Greece, Hungary, the Republic of Ireland, mainland Italy, Kaliningrad, Latvia, Liechtenstein, Lithuania, Luxembourg, Malta, Moldova, Northern Ireland, North Macedonia, mainland Norway, Poland, Russia, Sardinia (doubtful), Slovakia, Slovenia, mainland Spain, Sweden, Switzerland, the Netherlands, Ukraine, and Yugoslavia.
