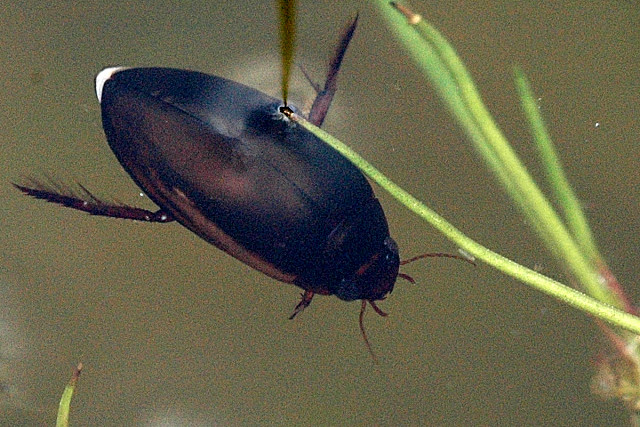
- Ilybius quadriguttatus

Scientific classification
- Domain: Eukaryota
- Kingdom: Animalia
- Phylum: Arthropoda
- Class: Insecta
- Order: Coleoptera
- Suborder: Adephaga
- Family: Dytiscidae
- Genus: Ilybius
- Species: I. quadriguttatus

Binomial name
- Ilybius quadriguttatus (Lacordaire, 1835)

= Ilybius quadriguttatus =

Species of beetle

Ilybius quadriguttatus is a species of beetle native to Europe and Near East. In Europe, it is found in Austria, Belarus, Belgium, Bulgaria, Croatia, the Czech Republic, mainland Denmark, Estonia, Finland, mainland France, Germany, Great Britain including the Isle of Man, Hungary, mainland Italy, Kaliningrad, Latvia, Liechtenstein, Lithuania, mainland Norway, Poland, Romania, Russia, Slovakia, Slovenia, mainland Spain, Sweden, Switzerland, the Netherlands, Ukraine and Yugoslavia.
