= Laccornis pacificus =

Scientific classification
- Domain: Eukaryota
- Kingdom: Animalia
- Phylum: Arthropoda
- Class: Insecta
- Order: Coleoptera
- Suborder: Adephaga
- Family: Dytiscidae
- Genus: Laccornis
- Species: L. pacificus

Binomial name
- Laccornis pacificus Leech, 1940

Species of beetle

Laccornis pacificus is a species of predaceous diving beetle in the family Dytiscidae. It is found in North America.
