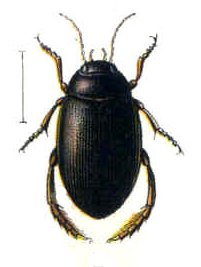
- Ilybius chalconatus

Scientific classification
- Kingdom: Animalia
- Phylum: Arthropoda
- Clade: Pancrustacea
- Class: Insecta
- Order: Coleoptera
- Suborder: Adephaga
- Family: Dytiscidae
- Subfamily: Agabinae
- Genus: Ilybius
- Species: I. chalconatus

Binomial name
- Ilybius chalconatus (Panzer, 1796)

Synonyms
- Agabus chalconatus (Panzer, 1796); Agabus chalconotus (Panzer, 1796); Dytiscus chalconatus Panzer, 1797

= Ilybius chalconatus =

Species of beetle

Ilybius chalconatus is a species of predaceous diving beetle in the family Dytiscidae. It is found in the Palearctic.
