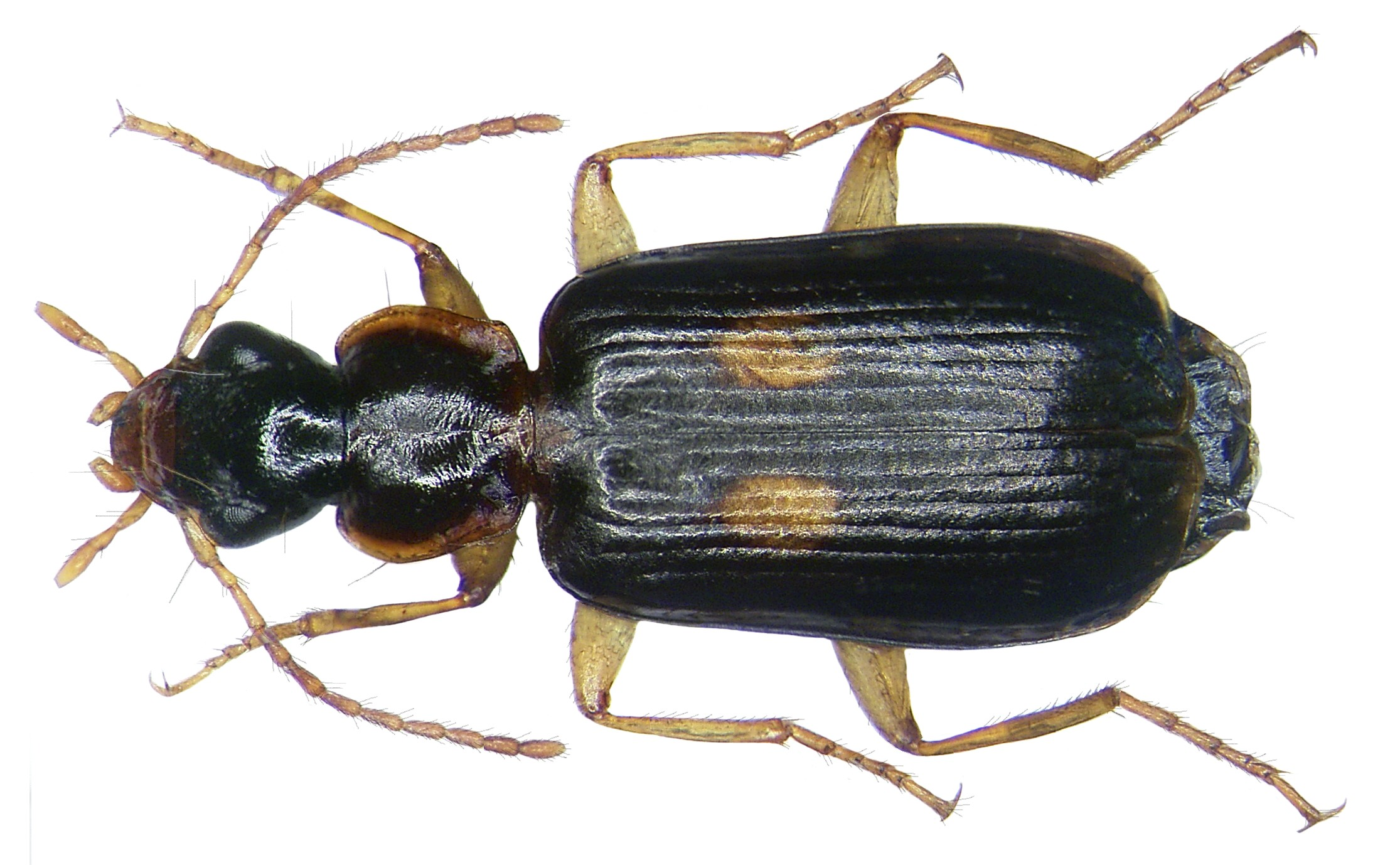

Scientific classification
- Kingdom: Animalia
- Phylum: Arthropoda
- Class: Insecta
- Order: Coleoptera
- Suborder: Adephaga
- Family: Carabidae
- Genus: Dromius
- Species: D. fenestratus

Binomial name
- Dromius fenestratus (Fabricius, 1794)

= Dromius fenestratus =

Species of beetle

Dromius fenestratus is a species of ground beetle in the family Carabidae. It is found in North America and Europe.
