= Ilybius hypomelas =

Scientific classification
- Domain: Eukaryota
- Kingdom: Animalia
- Phylum: Arthropoda
- Class: Insecta
- Order: Coleoptera
- Suborder: Adephaga
- Family: Dytiscidae
- Genus: Ilybius
- Species: I. hypomelas

Binomial name
- Ilybius hypomelas (Mannerheim, 1843)

Synonyms
- Agabus hypomelas Mannerheim, 1843

Species of beetle

Ilybius hypomelas is a species of predaceous diving beetle in the family Dytiscidae. It is found in North America.
