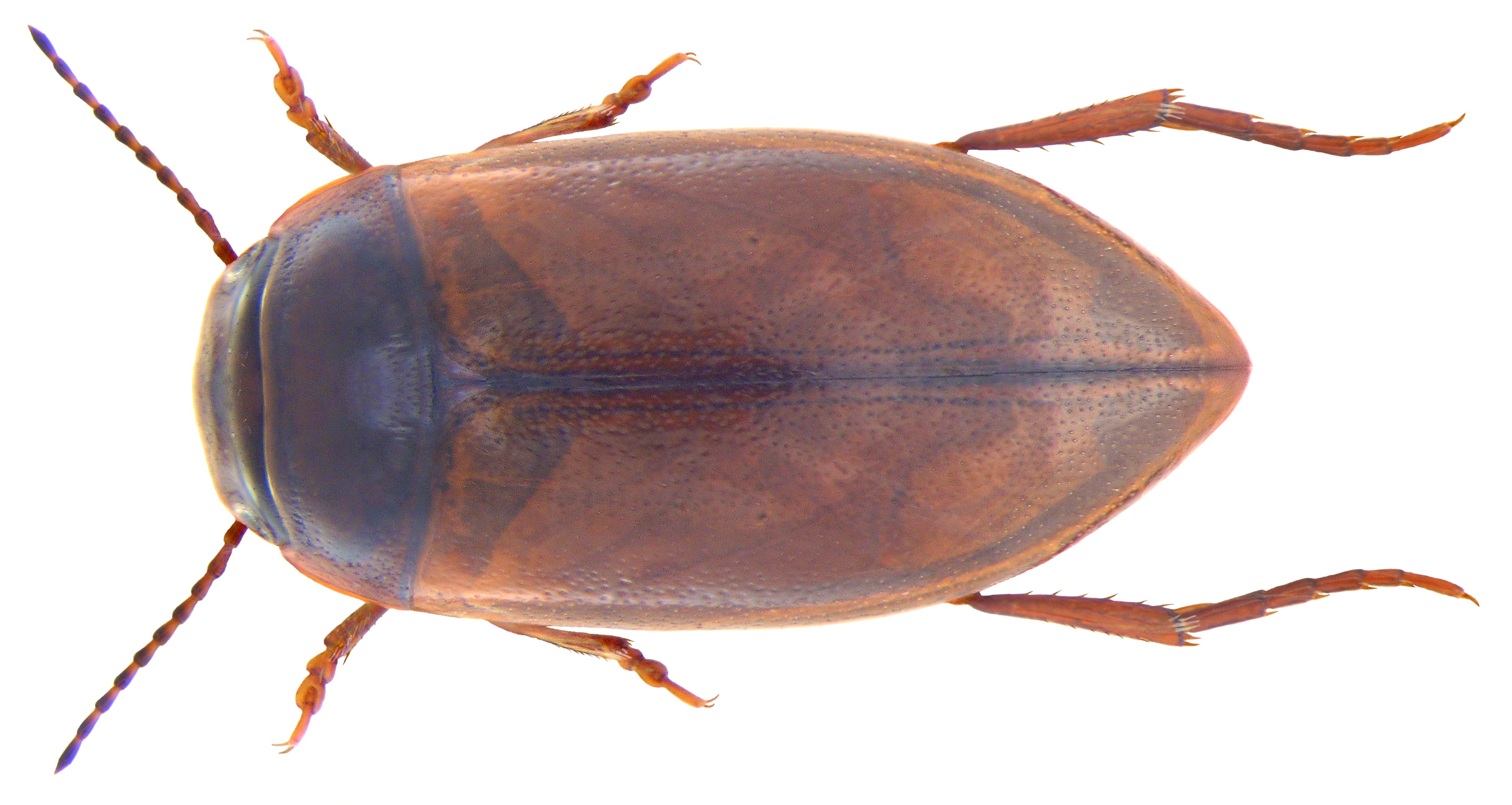
- Laccornis oblongus (Stephens, 1835)

Scientific classification
- Kingdom: Animalia
- Phylum: Arthropoda
- Class: Insecta
- Order: Coleoptera
- Suborder: Adephaga
- Family: Dytiscidae
- Subfamily: Hydroporinae
- Genus: Laccornis; Gozis, 1914

= Laccornis =

Genus of beetles

Laccornis is a genus of beetles in the family Dytiscidae, containing the following species:

- Laccornis conoideus (LeConte, 1850)
- Laccornis deltoides (Fall, 1923)
- Laccornis difformis (LeConte, 1855)
- Laccornis etnieri Wolfe & Spangler, 1985
- Laccornis kocae (Ganglbauer, 1904)
- Laccornis latens (Fall, 1937)
- Laccornis nemorosus Wolfe & Roughley, 1990
- Laccornis oblongus (Stephens, 1835)
- Laccornis pacificus Leech, 1940
- Laccornis schusteri Wolfe & Spangler, 1985
