= Ilybius erichsoni =

Scientific classification
- Domain: Eukaryota
- Kingdom: Animalia
- Phylum: Arthropoda
- Class: Insecta
- Order: Coleoptera
- Suborder: Adephaga
- Family: Dytiscidae
- Genus: Ilybius
- Species: I. erichsoni

Binomial name
- Ilybius erichsoni (Gemminger & Harold, 1868)

Synonyms
- Agabus erichsoni Gemminger and Harold, 1868

Species of beetle

Ilybius erichsoni is a species of predaceous diving beetle in the family Dytiscidae. It is found in North America and the Palearctic.
