= Ilybiosoma seriatum =

Scientific classification
- Domain: Eukaryota
- Kingdom: Animalia
- Phylum: Arthropoda
- Class: Insecta
- Order: Coleoptera
- Suborder: Adephaga
- Family: Dytiscidae
- Genus: Ilybiosoma
- Species: I. seriatum

Binomial name
- Ilybiosoma seriatum (Say, 1823)

Synonyms
- Agabus seriatus intersectus (Crotch, 1873)

Species of beetle

Ilybiosoma seriatum is a species of predaceous diving beetle in the family Dytiscidae. It is found in North America.
