= Ilybius opacus =

Scientific classification
- Domain: Eukaryota
- Kingdom: Animalia
- Phylum: Arthropoda
- Class: Insecta
- Order: Coleoptera
- Suborder: Adephaga
- Family: Dytiscidae
- Genus: Ilybius
- Species: I. opacus

Binomial name
- Ilybius opacus (Aubé, 1837)

Synonyms
- Agabus gelidus Fall, 1926; Agabus opacus Aubé, 1837; Agabus pseudoconfertus Wallis, 1926

Species of beetle

Ilybius opacus is a species of predaceous diving beetle in the family Dytiscidae. It is found in North America and the Palearctic.
