= Ilybius pleuriticus =

Scientific classification
- Domain: Eukaryota
- Kingdom: Animalia
- Phylum: Arthropoda
- Class: Insecta
- Order: Coleoptera
- Suborder: Adephaga
- Family: Dytiscidae
- Genus: Ilybius
- Species: I. pleuriticus

Binomial name
- Ilybius pleuriticus LeConte, 1850

Species of beetle

Ilybius pleuriticus is a species of predaceous diving beetle in the family Dytiscidae. It is found in North America.
