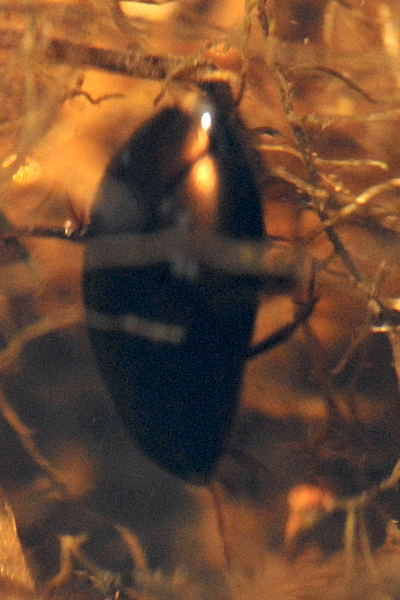

Scientific classification
- Domain: Eukaryota
- Kingdom: Animalia
- Phylum: Arthropoda
- Class: Insecta
- Order: Coleoptera
- Suborder: Adephaga
- Family: Dytiscidae
- Genus: Ilybius
- Species: I. montanus

Binomial name
- Ilybius montanus (Stephens, 1828)

= Ilybius montanus =

Species of beetle

Ilybius montanus is a species of beetle native to Europe and North Africa. In Europe, it is found in Belgium, Bosnia and Herzegovina, Great Britain (incl. Isle of Man, Corsica, mainland Denmark, mainland France, Germany, IrelandLithuania, Poland, mainland Portugal, Sardinia, Sicily, mainland Spain, and the Netherlands.
