= Ilybius picipes =

Scientific classification
- Domain: Eukaryota
- Kingdom: Animalia
- Phylum: Arthropoda
- Class: Insecta
- Order: Coleoptera
- Suborder: Adephaga
- Family: Dytiscidae
- Genus: Ilybius
- Species: I. picipes

Binomial name
- Ilybius picipes (Kirby, 1837)

Species of beetle

Ilybius picipes is a species of predaceous diving beetle in the family Dytiscidae. It is found in North America and the Palearctic.
