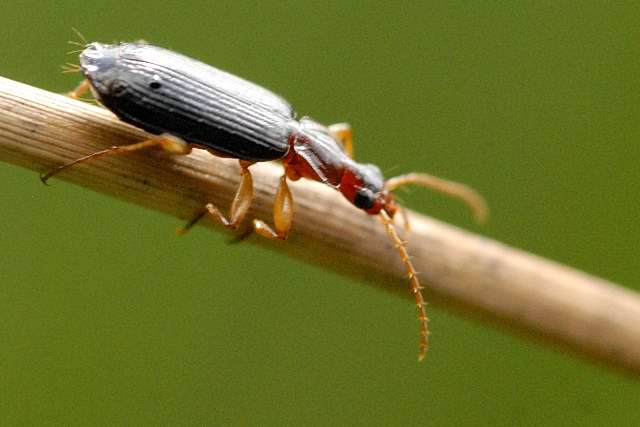
- Dromius agilis

Scientific classification
- Kingdom: Animalia
- Phylum: Arthropoda
- Class: Insecta
- Order: Coleoptera
- Suborder: Adephaga
- Family: Carabidae
- Subfamily: Lebiinae
- Tribe: Lebiini
- Genus: Dromius
- Species: D. agilis

Binomial name
- Dromius agilis (Fabricius, 1787)

= Dromius agilis =

Species of beetle

Dromius agilis is a species of ground beetle in the family Carabidae. It is found in the Palearctic.
