= Ilybius incarinatus =

Scientific classification
- Domain: Eukaryota
- Kingdom: Animalia
- Phylum: Arthropoda
- Class: Insecta
- Order: Coleoptera
- Suborder: Adephaga
- Family: Dytiscidae
- Genus: Ilybius
- Species: I. incarinatus

Binomial name
- Ilybius incarinatus Zimmermann, 1928

Species of beetle

Ilybius incarinatus is a species of predaceous diving beetle in the family Dytiscidae. It is found in North America.
