= Dromius piceus =

Scientific classification
- Kingdom: Animalia
- Phylum: Arthropoda
- Clade: Pancrustacea
- Class: Insecta
- Order: Coleoptera
- Suborder: Adephaga
- Family: Carabidae
- Genus: Dromius
- Species: D. piceus

Binomial name
- Dromius piceus Dejean, 1831

Species of beetle

Dromius piceus is a species of arboreal beetle in the family Carabidae. It is found in Canada and the United States.
