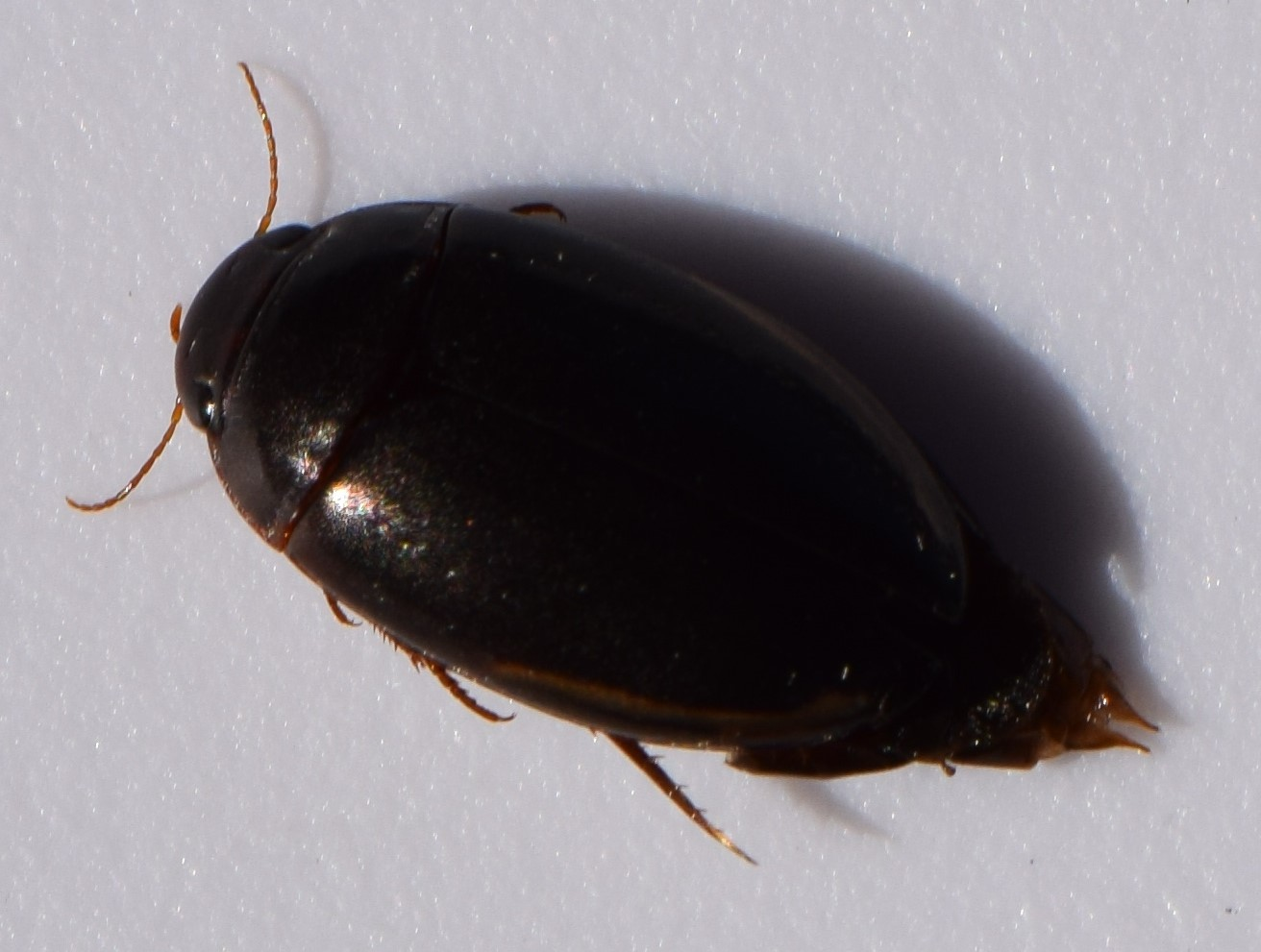

Scientific classification
- Domain: Eukaryota
- Kingdom: Animalia
- Phylum: Arthropoda
- Class: Insecta
- Order: Coleoptera
- Suborder: Adephaga
- Family: Dytiscidae
- Genus: Platambus
- Species: P. astrictovittatus

Binomial name
- Platambus astrictovittatus (Larson & Wolfe, 1998)

Synonyms
- Agabus astrictovittatus Larson and Wolfe, 1998

= Platambus astrictovittatus =

Species of beetle

Platambus astrictovittatus is a species of predaceous diving beetle in the family Dytiscidae. It is found in North America.

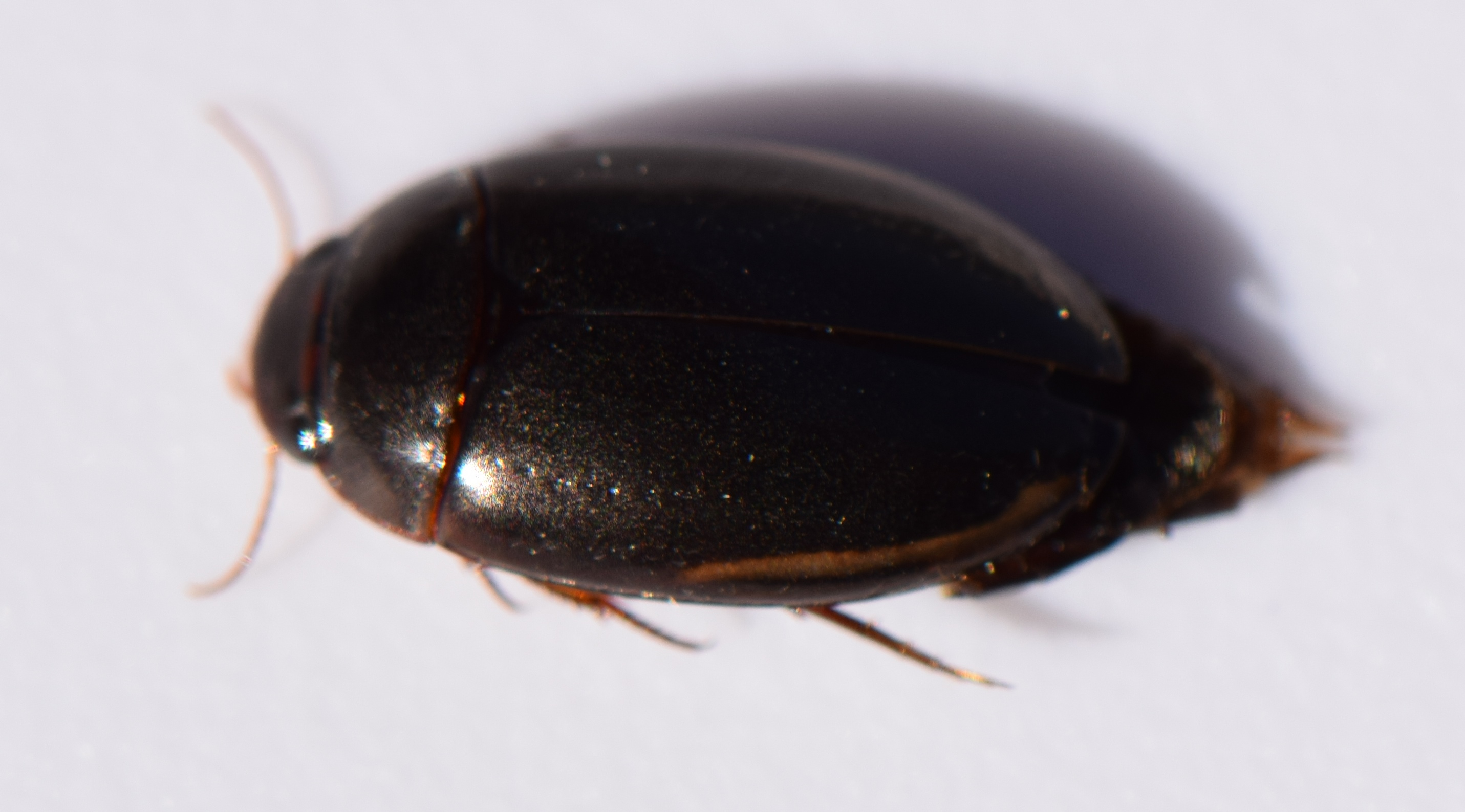
