= Ilybius oblitus =

Scientific classification
- Kingdom: Animalia
- Phylum: Arthropoda
- Class: Insecta
- Order: Coleoptera
- Suborder: Adephaga
- Family: Dytiscidae
- Genus: Ilybius
- Species: I. oblitus

Binomial name
- Ilybius oblitus Sharp, 1882

Species of beetle

Ilybius oblitus is a species of predaceous diving beetle in the family Dytiscidae. It is found in North America. This species can tolerate low temperatures, but is still susceptible to freezing.
