= Ilybius larsoni =

Scientific classification
- Domain: Eukaryota
- Kingdom: Animalia
- Phylum: Arthropoda
- Class: Insecta
- Order: Coleoptera
- Suborder: Adephaga
- Family: Dytiscidae
- Genus: Ilybius
- Species: I. larsoni

Binomial name
- Ilybius larsoni (Fery & Nilsson, 1993)

Synonyms
- Agabus larsoni Fery and Nilsson, 1993

Species of beetle

Ilybius larsoni is a species of predaceous diving beetle in the family Dytiscidae. It is found in North America.
