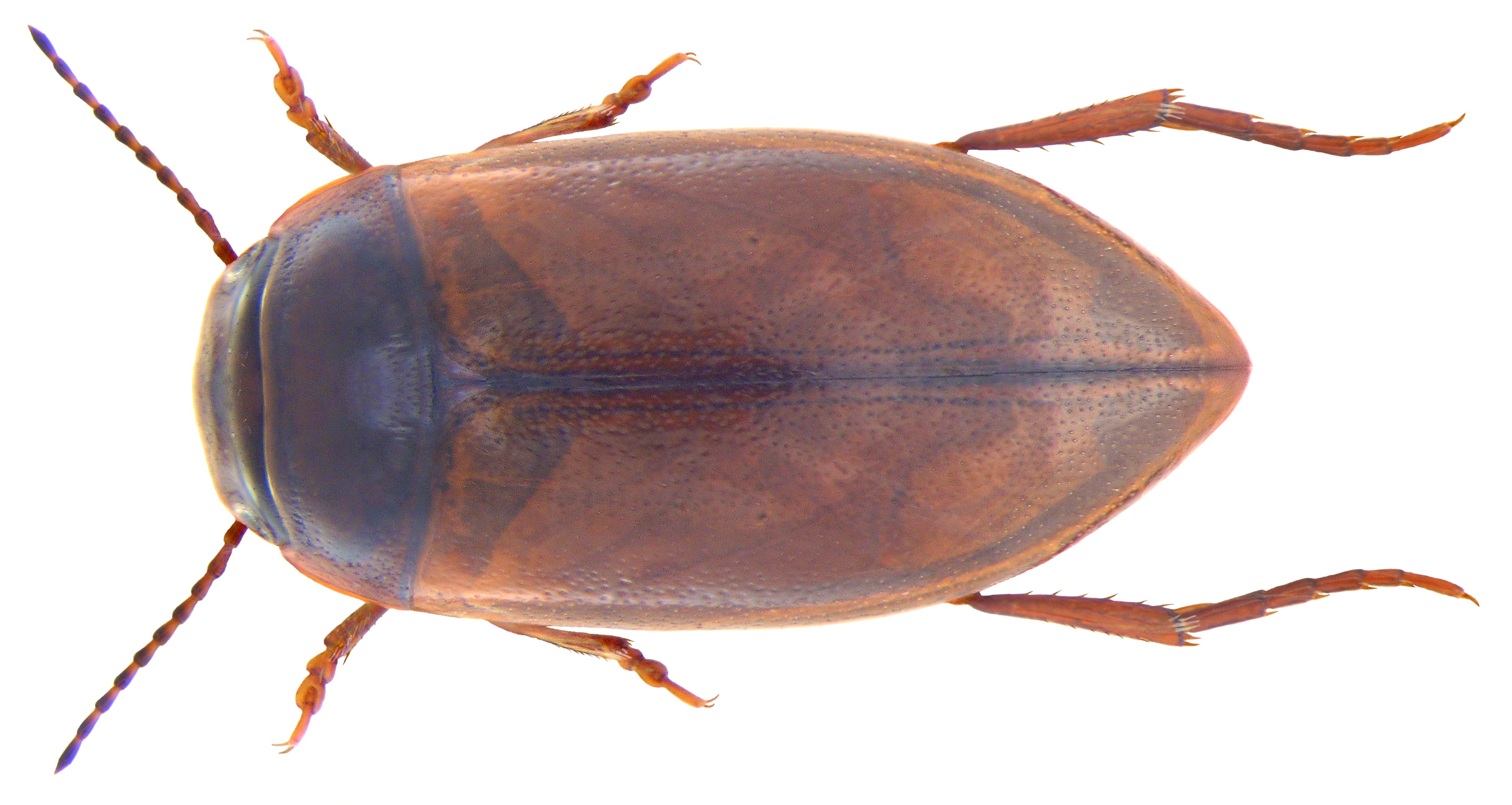

Scientific classification
- Kingdom: Animalia
- Phylum: Arthropoda
- Class: Insecta
- Order: Coleoptera
- Suborder: Adephaga
- Family: Dytiscidae
- Genus: Laccornis
- Species: L. oblongus

Binomial name
- Laccornis oblongus (Stephens, 1835)

= Laccornis oblongus =

Species of beetle

Laccornis oblongus is a species of beetle belonging to the family Dytiscidae.

It is native to Northern Europe.
