= Platambus apache =

Scientific classification
- Kingdom: Animalia
- Phylum: Arthropoda
- Class: Insecta
- Order: Coleoptera
- Suborder: Adephaga
- Family: Dytiscidae
- Genus: Platambus
- Species: P. apache

Binomial name
- Platambus apache (Young, 1981)

Synonyms
- Agabus apache Young, 1981

Species of beetle

Platambus apache is a species of predacious diving beetle belonging to the family Dytiscidae. This species is endemic to the Chiricahua Mountains, Arizona, USA. It has only been found at elevations of 7,000 feet or above. This species is very similar to Platambus spinipes, and both species closely resemble tenebrionid beetles. Unlike most diving beetles, it has reduced swimming "hairs", and likely spends most of its time crawling rather than swimming.
