= Ilybius fraterculus =

Scientific classification
- Domain: Eukaryota
- Kingdom: Animalia
- Phylum: Arthropoda
- Class: Insecta
- Order: Coleoptera
- Suborder: Adephaga
- Family: Dytiscidae
- Genus: Ilybius
- Species: I. fraterculus

Binomial name
- Ilybius fraterculus LeConte, 1862

Species of beetle

Ilybius fraterculus is a species of predaceous diving beetles in the family Dytiscidae. It is found in North America.
