= Agabinus glabrellus =

Scientific classification
- Domain: Eukaryota
- Kingdom: Animalia
- Phylum: Arthropoda
- Class: Insecta
- Order: Coleoptera
- Suborder: Adephaga
- Family: Dytiscidae
- Genus: Agabinus
- Species: A. glabrellus

Binomial name
- Agabinus glabrellus (Motschulsky, 1859)

Species of beetle

Agabinus glabrellus is a species of predaceous diving beetle in the family Dytiscidae. It is found in North America.
