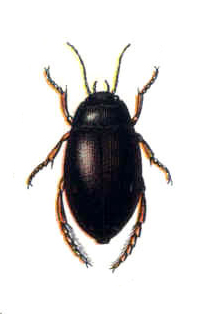
- Ilybius fenestratus

Scientific classification
- Kingdom: Animalia
- Phylum: Arthropoda
- Clade: Pancrustacea
- Class: Insecta
- Order: Coleoptera
- Suborder: Adephaga
- Family: Dytiscidae
- Genus: Ilybius
- Species: I. fenestratus

Binomial name
- Ilybius fenestratus (Fabricius, 1781)

= Ilybius fenestratus =

Species of beetle

Ilybius fenestratus is a species of beetle found throughout Europe and Northern Asia. It was first described by Johan Christian Fabricius in 1781.

The scent gland of this species of beetle is natural source for the anabolic steroid boldenone (Δ^{1}-testosterone).

== Life cycle ==
A study conducted in Målsjøen found the life cycle of the species to be semivoltine, with adults emerging in midsummer. They hibernate over the winter, possibly in the water, the hibernation lasting until mid-June. Breeding takes place from mid- to late summer, the last adults dying in autumn. The larvae hatch in late summer and hibernate, in the water, until April to May, when they emerge from the water to pupate.
