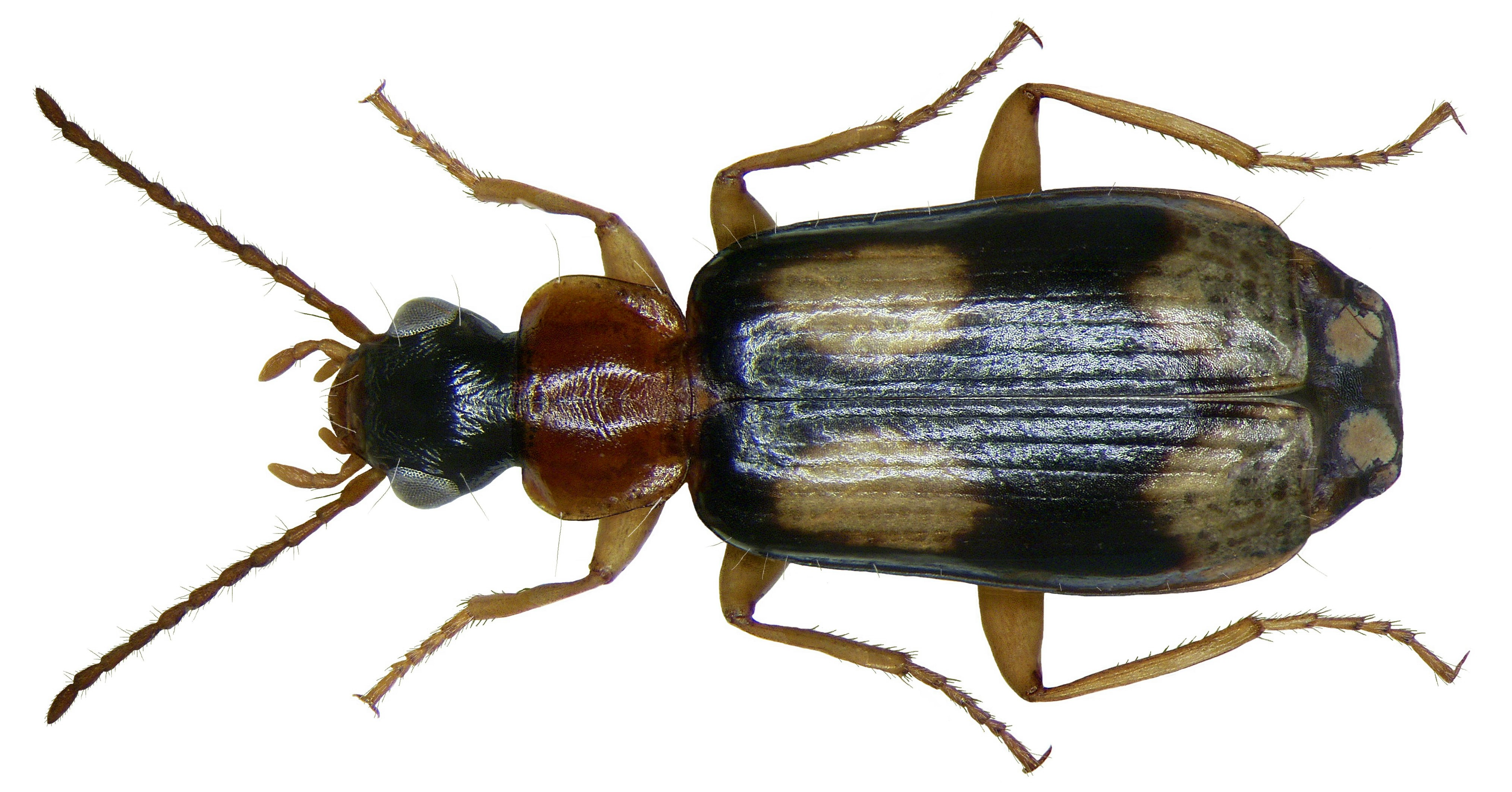
- Dromius quadrimaculatus

Scientific classification
- Domain: Eukaryota
- Kingdom: Animalia
- Phylum: Arthropoda
- Class: Insecta
- Order: Coleoptera
- Suborder: Adephaga
- Family: Carabidae
- Subfamily: Lebiinae
- Tribe: Lebiini
- Genus: Dromius; Bonelli, 1810

Subgenera
- Dromius Bonelli, 1810; Klepterus Péringuey, 1896; Obodromius Jedlicka, 1947

= Dromius =

Genus of beetles

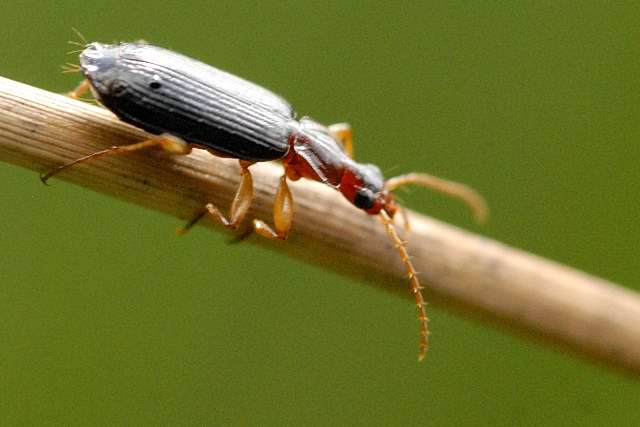
Dromius agilis

Dromius is a genus of ground beetle native to the Palearctic (including Europe), the Nearctic, the Near East, and North Africa.

== Species ==
These 108 species belong to the genus Dromius:

- Dromius agilis (Fabricius, 1787)
- Dromius alesi Jedlicka, 1935
- Dromius alfierii Peyerimhoff, 1927
- Dromius alienus Bates, 1889
- Dromius andrewesi (Jedlicka, 1955)
- Dromius angusticollis J.Sahlberg, 1880
- Dromius angustus Brullé, 1834
- Dromius apterus Mateu, 1997
- Dromius arcuatocollis (Basilewsky, 1957)
- Dromius argentinensis Mateu, 1992
- Dromius assamicus Jedlicka, 1964
- Dromius ater Motschulsky, 1859
- Dromius baehri Mateu, 1997
- Dromius basilewskyi (A.Serrano, 1995)
- Dromius batesi Habu, 1958
- Dromius bhutanensis Mateu, 1977
- Dromius bohumilae Mateu, 1985
- Dromius bordoni Mateu, 1979
- Dromius borysthenicus Motschulsky, 1850
- Dromius brittoni Mateu, 1957
- Dromius buettikeri Mateu, 1990
- Dromius calathoides Landin, 1955
- Dromius capnodes Andrewes, 1933
- Dromius chihuahuae Casey, 1920
- Dromius chinensis Jedlicka, 1965
- Dromius chobauti Puel, 1924
- Dromius codonotus Andrewes, 1933
- Dromius columbianus Mateu, 1979
- Dromius comma Andrewes, 1933
- Dromius consobrinus (Péringuey, 1896)
- Dromius crassipalpis Bates, 1883
- Dromius cyaneus Dejean, 1831
- Dromius cymindoides Andrewes, 1933
- Dromius decellei (Basilewsky, 1968)
- Dromius despectus (Jedlicka, 1940)
- Dromius elongatulus Mateu, 1973
- Dromius eremnus Andrewes, 1933
- Dromius fenestratus (Fabricius, 1794)
- Dromius flavipes Brullé, 1837
- Dromius flohri Bates, 1883
- Dromius formosanus (Jedlicka, 1940)
- Dromius fukiensis (Jedlicka, 1956)
- Dromius geisthardti Mateu, 1990
- Dromius giachinoi Mateu, 1992
- Dromius guatemalenus Bates, 1883
- Dromius hagai Mateu, 1992
- Dromius hauserianus Lorenz, 1998
- Dromius hiemalis Kryzhanovskij & Mikhailov, 1987
- Dromius hilarus Andrewes, 1937
- Dromius indicus Andrewes, 1923
- Dromius ivorensis (Basilewsky, 1968)
- Dromius jureceki (Jedlicka, 1935)
- Dromius kivuanus (Basilewsky, 1957)
- Dromius kulti (Jedlicka, 1947)
- Dromius kuntzei Polentz, 1939
- Dromius kurilensis Lafer, 1989
- Dromius laeviceps Motschulsky, 1850
- Dromius laevipennis Landin, 1955
- Dromius ledouxi Mateu, 1997
- Dromius lieftincki Louwerens, 1952
- Dromius lindemannae Jedlicka, 1963
- Dromius macer Andrewes, 1947
- Dromius macrocephalus Solier, 1849
- Dromius maculipennis (Solier, 1849)
- Dromius majorinus (Péringuey, 1896)
- Dromius maritimus Lafer, 1989
- Dromius martae Mateu, 1991
- Dromius matsudai Habu, 1952
- Dromius meghalayanus Mateu, 1997
- Dromius meridionalis Dejean, 1825
- Dromius meruanus (Basilewsky, 1962)
- Dromius miwai (Jedlicka, 1940)
- Dromius murgabicus Kryzhanovskij & Mikhailov, 1987
- Dromius nagatomii Jedlicka, 1966
- Dromius negrei Mateu, 1973
- Dromius neotropicalis Mateu, 1973
- Dromius nepalensis Jedlicka, 1966
- Dromius nipponicus Habu, 1983
- Dromius nyamukubiensis (Burgeon, 1937)
- Dromius orestes Andrewes, 1933
- Dromius orthogonioides Bates, 1886
- Dromius pallidicollis (Péringuey, 1896)
- Dromius piceus Dejean, 1831
- Dromius plutenkoi Lafer, 1989
- Dromius prolixus Bates, 1883
- Dromius quadraticollis A.Morawitz, 1862
- Dromius quadrimaculatus (Linnaeus, 1758)
- Dromius rhodesianus (Basilewsky, 1957)
- Dromius rufocastaneus Mateu, 1997
- Dromius rugulosus Mateu, 1973
- Dromius ruwenzoricus (Burgeon, 1937)
- Dromius saudiarabicus Rasool; Abdel-Dayem & Felix, 2018
- Dromius schneideri Crotch, 1871
- Dromius semiplagiatus Reitter, 1887
- Dromius simplicior Antoine, 1963
- Dromius sinuatus Landin, 1955
- Dromius somalicus (Basilewsky, 1957)
- Dromius sulcatulus Solier, 1849
- Dromius tolanus (Basilewsky, 1953)
- Dromius ugandanus (Basilewsky, 1949)
- Dromius umbrinus Landin, 1955
- Dromius univestis (Jedlicka, 1940)
- Dromius vaneyeni (Basilewsky, 1957)
- Dromius venezolanus Mateu, 1973
- Dromius wittmeri Mateu, 1977
- † Dromius bakeri Abdullah, 1969
- † Dromius longipes Zhang; Liu & Shangguan, 1989
- † Dromius resinatus Giebel, 1856
