= Laccornis latens =

Scientific classification
- Domain: Eukaryota
- Kingdom: Animalia
- Phylum: Arthropoda
- Class: Insecta
- Order: Coleoptera
- Suborder: Adephaga
- Family: Dytiscidae
- Genus: Laccornis
- Species: L. latens

Binomial name
- Laccornis latens (Fall, 1937)

Species of beetle

Laccornis latens is a species of predaceous diving beetle in the family Dytiscidae. It is found in North America.
