= Platambus semivittatus =

Scientific classification
- Domain: Eukaryota
- Kingdom: Animalia
- Phylum: Arthropoda
- Class: Insecta
- Order: Coleoptera
- Suborder: Adephaga
- Family: Dytiscidae
- Genus: Platambus
- Species: P. semivittatus

Binomial name
- Platambus semivittatus (LeConte, 1852)

Synonyms
- Agabus semivittatus LeConte, 1852; Agabus texanus Sharp, 1882

Species of beetle

Platambus semivittatus is a species of predaceous diving beetle in the family Dytiscidae. It is found in North America. It has a wide distribution across North America but can primarily be found from the Great Lakes Region to Arizona.
