= Laccornis conoideus =

Scientific classification
- Domain: Eukaryota
- Kingdom: Animalia
- Phylum: Arthropoda
- Class: Insecta
- Order: Coleoptera
- Suborder: Adephaga
- Family: Dytiscidae
- Genus: Laccornis
- Species: L. conoideus

Binomial name
- Laccornis conoideus (LeConte, 1850)

Species of beetle

Laccornis conoideus is a species of predaceous diving beetle in the family Dytiscidae. It is found in North America.
