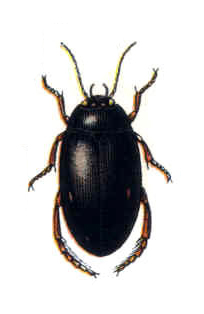

Scientific classification
- Kingdom: Animalia
- Phylum: Arthropoda
- Class: Insecta
- Order: Coleoptera
- Suborder: Adephaga
- Family: Dytiscidae
- Genus: Ilybius
- Species: I. angustior

Binomial name
- Ilybius angustior (Gyllenhal, 1808)

= Ilybius angustior =

Species of beetle

Ilybius angustior is a species of predaceous diving beetle in the family Dytiscidae. It is found in North America and the Palearctic.
