= Hydrotrupes palpalis =

Scientific classification
- Kingdom: Animalia
- Phylum: Arthropoda
- Class: Insecta
- Order: Coleoptera
- Suborder: Adephaga
- Family: Dytiscidae
- Genus: Hydrotrupes
- Species: H. palpalis

Binomial name
- Hydrotrupes palpalis Sharp, 1882

Species of beetle

Hydrotrupes palpalis is a species of predaceous diving beetle in the family Dytiscidae. It is found in North America.
