= Ilybius biguttulus =

Scientific classification
- Domain: Eukaryota
- Kingdom: Animalia
- Phylum: Arthropoda
- Class: Insecta
- Order: Coleoptera
- Suborder: Adephaga
- Family: Dytiscidae
- Genus: Ilybius
- Species: I. biguttulus

Binomial name
- Ilybius biguttulus (Germar, 1824)

Synonyms
- Ilybius laramaeus LeConte, 1859

Species of beetle

Ilybius biguttulus is a species of predaceous diving beetle in the family Dytiscidae. It is found in North America.
