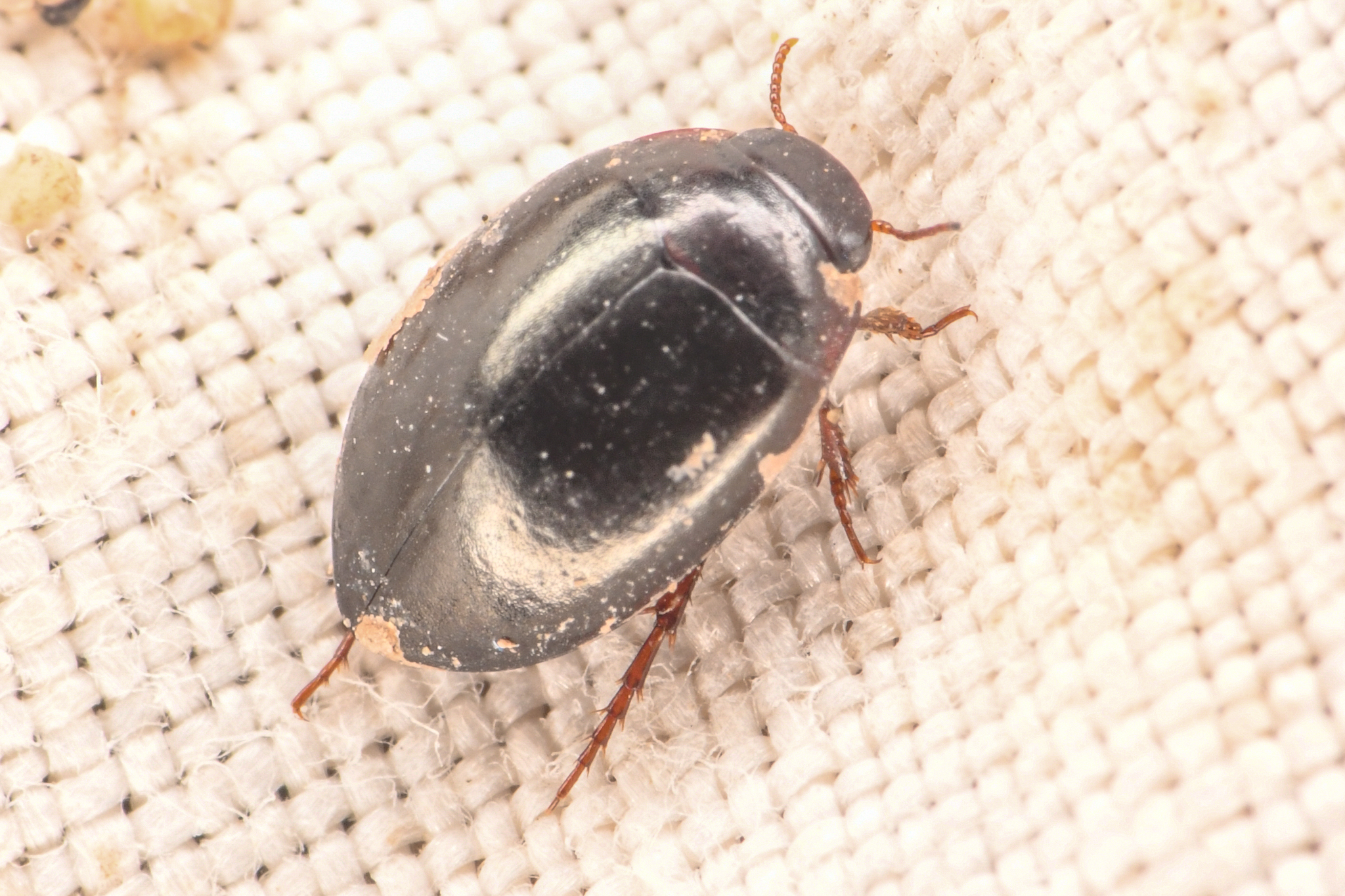
- Hydrotrupes palpalis, California

Scientific classification
- Kingdom: Animalia
- Phylum: Arthropoda
- Class: Insecta
- Order: Coleoptera
- Suborder: Adephaga
- Family: Dytiscidae
- Subfamily: Agabinae
- Genus: Hydrotrupes; Sharp, 1882

= Hydrotrupes =

Genus of beetles

Hydrotrupes is a genus of beetles in the family Dytiscidae, containing the following species:

- Hydrotrupes chinensis Nilsson, 2003
- Hydrotrupes palpalis Sharp, 1882
- ✝Hydrotrupes prometheus R.A. Gómez & A.L. Damgaard, 2013
