= Agabinus =

Scientific classification
- Domain: Eukaryota
- Kingdom: Animalia
- Phylum: Arthropoda
- Class: Insecta
- Order: Coleoptera
- Suborder: Adephaga
- Family: Dytiscidae
- Subfamily: Agabinae
- Genus: Agabinus; Crotch, 1873

Genus of beetles

Agabinus is a genus of predaceous diving beetles in the family Dytiscidae. There are at least two described species in Agabinus. They are found in North America.

== Species ==
These two species belong to the genus Agabinus:

- Agabinus glabrellus (Motschulsky, 1859)
- Agabinus sculpturellus Zimmermann, 1919
