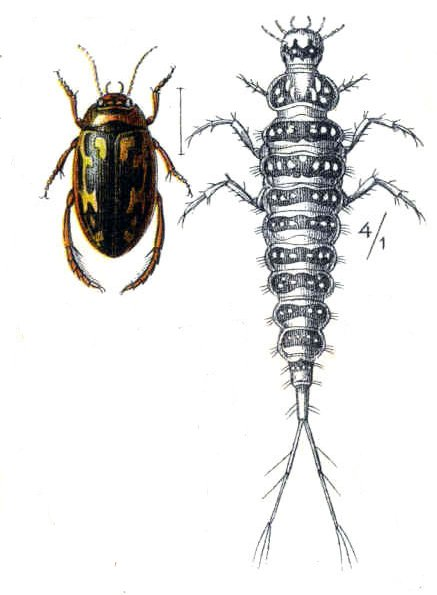
- Platambus maculatus

Scientific classification
- Kingdom: Animalia
- Phylum: Arthropoda
- Class: Insecta
- Order: Coleoptera
- Suborder: Adephaga
- Family: Dytiscidae
- Tribe: Agabini
- Genus: Platambus; Thomson, 1859

= Platambus =

Genus of beetles

Platambus is a genus of beetle native to the Palearctic, including Europe, the Near East and North Africa. It distinguished by a wide epipleuron. The ventral surface has spot markings.

It contains the following species:

- Platambus americanus (Aubé, 1838)
- Platambus angulicollis (Régimbart, 1899)
- Platambus apache (Young, 1981)
- Platambus astrictovittatus (Larson & Wolfe, 1998)
- Platambus ater (Falkenström, 1936)
- Platambus aztec (Larson, 2000)
- Platambus balfourbrownei Vazirani, 1965
- Platambus biswasi Vazirani, 1965
- Platambus confusus (Blatchley, 1910)
- Platambus coriaceus (Régimbart, 1899)
- Platambus dabieshanensis Nilsson, 2003
- Platambus dembickyi Brancucci, 2006
- Platambus denticulatus Nilsson, 2003
- Platambus excoffieri Régimbart, 1899
- Platambus fimbriatus Sharp, 1884
- Platambus flavovittatus (Larson & Wolfe, 1998)
- Platambus fletcheri Zimmermann, 1928
- Platambus glabrellus (Motschulsky, 1859)
- Platambus guttulus (Régimbart, 1899)
- Platambus heteronychus Nilsson, 2003
- Platambus ikedai (Nilsson, 1997)
- Platambus incrassatus Gschwendtner, 1935
- Platambus insolitus (Sharp, 1884)
- Platambus johannis (Fall, 1922)
- Platambus kempi (Vazirani, 1970)
- Platambus khukri Brancucci, 1990
- Platambus koreanus (Nilsson, 1997)
- Platambus lindbergi Guéorguiev, 1963
- Platambus lineatus Gschwendtner, 1935
- Platambus lunulatus (Fischer von Waldheim, 1829)
- Platambus maculatus (Linnaeus, 1758)
- Platambus maya (Larson, 2000)
- Platambus mexicanus (Larson, 2000)
- Platambus micropunctatus Nilsson, 2003
- Platambus nepalensis (Guéorguiev, 1968)
- Platambus obtusatus (Say, 1823)
- Platambus optatus (Sharp, 1884)
- Platambus pictipennis (Sharp, 1873)
- Platambus planatus (Sharp, 1882)
- Platambus princeps (Régimbart, 1888)
- Platambus punctatipennis Brancucci, 1984
- Platambus regulae Brancucci, 1991
- Platambus satoi Brancucci, 1982
- Platambus sawadai (Kamiya, 1932)
- Platambus schaefleini Brancucci, 1988
- Platambus schillhammeri Wewalka & Brancucci, 1995
- Platambus sculpturellus (Zimmermann, 1919)
- Platambus semenowi (Jakovlev, 1897)
- Platambus semivittatus (LeConte, 1852)
- Platambus sogdianus (Jakovlev, 1897)
- Platambus spinipes (Sharp, 1882)
- Platambus stagninus (Say, 1823)
- Platambus strbai Hendrich & Balke, 1998
- Platambus striatus (Zeng & Pu, 1992)
- Platambus stygius (Régimbart, 1899)
- Platambus texovittatus (Larson & Wolfe, 1998)
- Platambus ussuriensis (Nilsson, 1997)
- Platambus wangi Brancucci, 2006
- Platambus wewalkai Brancucci, 1982
- Platambus wittmeri Wewalka, 1975
- Platambus wulingshanensis Brancucci, 2005
- Platambus yaanensis Nilsson, 2003
