= Ilybiosoma =

Scientific classification
- Kingdom: Animalia
- Phylum: Arthropoda
- Class: Insecta
- Order: Coleoptera
- Suborder: Adephaga
- Family: Dytiscidae
- Subfamily: Agabinae
- Genus: Ilybiosoma; Crotch, 1873

Genus of beetles

Ilybiosoma is a genus of beetles in the family Dytiscidae, containing the following species:

- Ilybiosoma amaroides (Sharp, 1882)
- Ilybiosoma bjorkmanae (Hatch, 1939)
- Ilybiosoma brevicolle (LeConte, 1857)
- Ilybiosoma cordatum (LeConte, 1853)
- Ilybiosoma discicolle (Ancey, 1882)
- Ilybiosoma flohrianum (Sharp, 1887)
- Ilybiosoma ilybiiforme (Zimmermann, 1928)
- Ilybiosoma kermanense (J.Balfour-Browne, 1939)
- Ilybiosoma lugens (LeConte, 1852)
- Ilybiosoma minnesotense (Wallis, 1933)
- Ilybiosoma oaxacaense (Larson, 2000)
- Ilybiosoma pandurum (Leech, 1942)
- Ilybiosoma perplexum (Sharp, 1882)
- Ilybiosoma regulare (LeConte, 1852)
- Ilybiosoma roguum (Larson, 1997)
- Ilybiosoma seriatum (Say, 1823)
- Ilybiosoma yeti Brancucci & Hendrich, 2006
