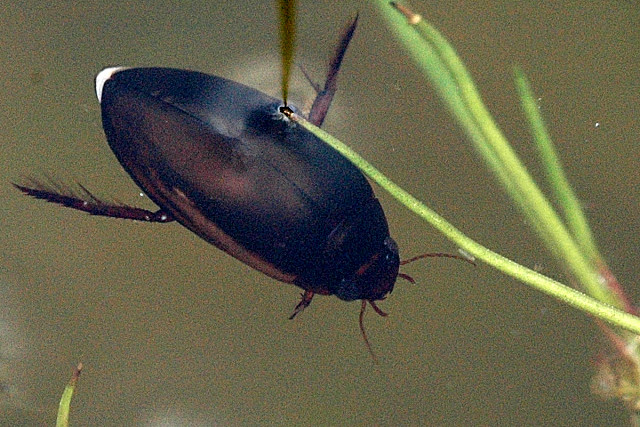
- Ilybius quadriguttatus

Scientific classification
- Kingdom: Animalia
- Phylum: Arthropoda
- Class: Insecta
- Order: Coleoptera
- Suborder: Adephaga
- Family: Dytiscidae
- Subfamily: Agabinae
- Genus: Ilybius; Erichson, 1832

= Ilybius =

Genus of beetles

Ilybius is a large genus of predatory aquatic beetles in the family Dytiscidae. The genus is native to the Palearctic (including Europe), the Near East, the Nearctic, and North Africa. 70 species has been described from this genus:

- Ilybius aenescens Thomson, 1870
- Ilybius albarracinensis (Fery, 1986)
- Ilybius angustior (Gyllenhal, 1808)
- Ilybius anjarum Nilsson, 1999
- Ilybius apicalis Sharp, 1873
- Ilybius ater (De Geer, 1774)
- Ilybius austrodiscors (Larson, 1996)
- Ilybius balkei (Fery & Nilsson, 1993)
- Ilybius bedeli (Zaitzev, 1908)
- Ilybius biguttulus (Germar, 1824)
- Ilybius boryslavicus Lomnicki, 1894
- Ilybius chalconatus (Panzer, 1796)
- Ilybius chishimanus Kôno, 1944
- Ilybius churchillensis Wallis, 1939
- Ilybius cinctus Sharp, 1878
- Ilybius confertus (LeConte, 1861)
- Ilybius confusus Aubé, 1838
- Ilybius crassus Thomson, 1856
- Ilybius dettneri (Fery, 1986)
- Ilybius discedens Sharp, 1882
- Ilybius discors (LeConte, 1861)
- Ilybius erichsoni (Gemminger & Harold, 1868)
- Ilybius euryomus (Larson, 1996)
- Ilybius fenestratus (Fabricius, 1781)
- Ilybius fraterculus LeConte, 1862
- Ilybius fuliginosus (Fabricius, 1792)
- Ilybius gagates (Aubé, 1838)
- Ilybius guttiger (Gyllenhal, 1808)
- Ilybius hozgargantae (Burmeister, 1983)
- Ilybius hulae (Wewalka, 1984)
- Ilybius hypomelas (Mannerheim, 1843)
- Ilybius ignarus (LeConte, 1862)
- Ilybius incarinatus Zimmermann, 1928
- Ilybius jaechi (Fery & Nilsson, 1993)
- Ilybius jimzim (Larson, 1996)
- Ilybius lagabrunensis (Schizzerotto & Fery, 1990)
- Ilybius larsoni (Fery & Nilsson, 1993)
- Ilybius lateralis (Gebler, 1832)
- Ilybius lenensis Nilsson, 2000
- Ilybius lenkoranensis (Fery & Nilsson, 1993)
- Ilybius lineellus (LeConte, 1861)
- Ilybius meridionalis Aubé, 1837
- Ilybius montanus (Stephens, 1828)
- Ilybius nakanei Nilsson, 1994
- Ilybius neglectus (Erichson, 1837)
- Ilybius oblitus Sharp, 1882
- Ilybius obtusus Sharp, 1882
- Ilybius opacus (Aubé, 1837)
- Ilybius ovalis Gschwendtner, 1934
- Ilybius pederzanii (Fery & Nilsson, 1993)
- Ilybius picipes (Kirby, 1837)
- Ilybius pleuriticus LeConte, 1850
- Ilybius poppiusi Zaitzev, 1907
- Ilybius pseudoneglectus (Franciscolo, 1972)
- Ilybius quadriguttatus (Lacordaire, 1835)
- Ilybius quadrimaculatus Aubé, 1838
- Ilybius samokovi (Fery & Nilsson, 1993)
- Ilybius satunini (Zaitzev, 1913)
- Ilybius similis Thomson, 1856
- Ilybius subaeneus Erichson, 1837
- Ilybius subtilis (Erichson, 1837)
- Ilybius thynias Fery & Przewozny, 2011
- Ilybius vancouverensis (Leech, 1937)
- Ilybius vandykei (Leech, 1942)
- Ilybius verisimilis (Brown, 1932)
- Ilybius vittiger (Gyllenhal, 1827)
- Ilybius walsinghami (Crotch, 1873)
- Ilybius wasastjernae (C.R.Sahlberg, 1824)
- Ilybius wewalkai (Fery & Nilsson, 1993)
