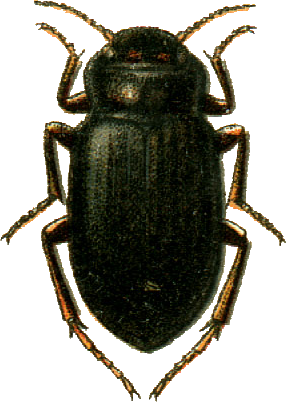
- Hydronebrius cordaticollis

Scientific classification
- Kingdom: Animalia
- Phylum: Arthropoda
- Class: Insecta
- Order: Coleoptera
- Suborder: Adephaga
- Family: Dytiscidae
- Genus: Hydronebrius; Jakovlev, 1897

= Hydronebrius =

Genus of beetles

Hydronebrius is a genus of beetles in the family Dytiscidae, containing the following species:

- Hydronebrius amplicollis Toledo, 1994
- Hydronebrius cordaticollis (Reitter, 1896)
- Hydronebrius kashmirensis (Vazirani, 1964)
- Hydronebrius mattheyi Brancucci, 1980
