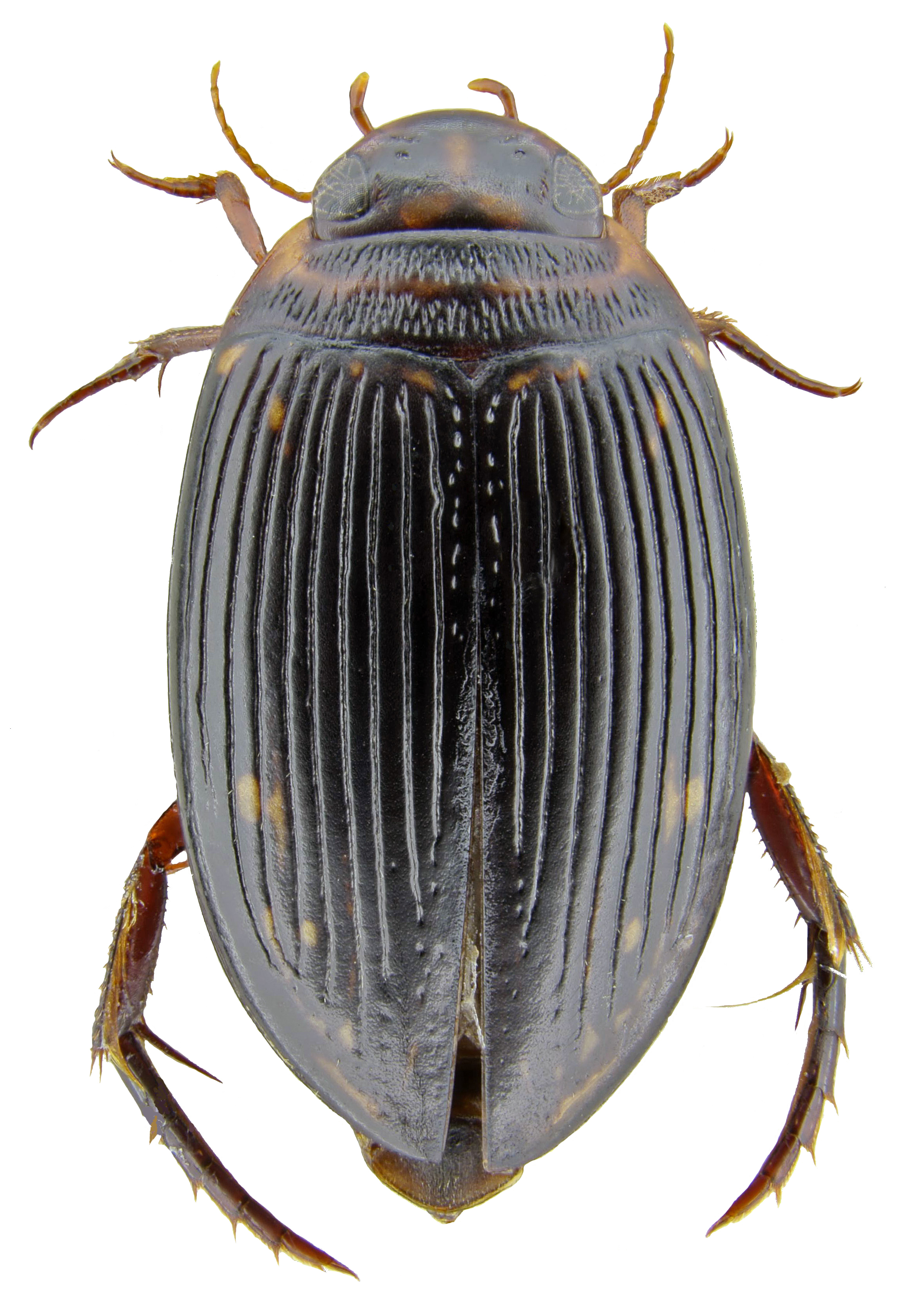
- Platynectes wewalkai

Scientific classification
- Kingdom: Animalia
- Phylum: Arthropoda
- Class: Insecta
- Order: Coleoptera
- Suborder: Adephaga
- Family: Dytiscidae
- Genus: Platynectes; Straneo, 1939

= Platynectes =

Genus of beetles

Platynectes is a genus of beetles in the family Dytiscidae, containing the species of Leuronectes, Agametrus, and the following species:

- Platynectes aenescens Sharp, 1882
- Platynectes ambonensis Hendrich & Balke, 2000
- Platynectes australicus Guéorguiev, 1972
- Platynectes babai Satô, 1982
- Platynectes bakewelli (Clark, 1863)
- Platynectes beroni Guéorguiev, 1978
- Platynectes brownei Guéorguiev, 1972
- Platynectes buruensis Zimmermann, 1925
- Platynectes chapmani Guéorguiev, 1978
- Platynectes chujoi Satô, 1982
- Platynectes darlingtoni Guéorguiev, 1972
- Platynectes decastigma Régimbart, 1899
- Platynectes decemnotatus (Aubé, 1838)
- Platynectes decempunctatus (Fabricius, 1775)
- Platynectes deletus Régimbart, 1899
- Platynectes dissimilis (Sharp, 1873)
- Platynectes gemellatus Stastný, 2003
- Platynectes gigas Hendrich & Balke, 2000
- Platynectes hainanensis Nilsson, 1998
- Platynectes jaechi Hendrich & Balke, 2000
- Platynectes javanus Nilsson, 1998
- Platynectes kashmiranus J.Balfour-Browne, 1944
- Platynectes laurianus Watts, 1978
- Platynectes magellanicus (Babington, 1841)
- Platynectes major Nilsson, 1998
- Platynectes manusela Hendrich & Balke, 2000
- Platynectes mazzoldii Stastný, 2003
- Platynectes moluccensis Hendrich & Balke, 2000
- Platynectes monostigma (Hope, 1841)
- Platynectes nanlingensis Stastný, 2003
- Platynectes neoguineensis Guéorguiev & Rocchi, 1993
- Platynectes nigerrimus (Aubé, 1838)
- Platynectes octodecimmaculatus (W.S.Macleay, 1825)
- Platynectes ornatifrons Sharp, 1882
- Platynectes parananus Sharp, 1882
- Platynectes ranongensis Nilsson, 1998
- Platynectes reticulosus (Clark, 1863)
- Platynectes rihai Stastný, 2003
- Platynectes rodriguezi Severin, 1890
- Platynectes semperi Régimbart, 1899
- Platynectes submaculatus (Laporte, 1835)
- Platynectes tasmaniae (Clark, 1863)
- Platynectes undecimguttatus (Aubé, 1838)
- Platynectes wewalkai Stastný, 2003
