= Andonectes =

Scientific classification
- Kingdom: Animalia
- Phylum: Arthropoda
- Class: Insecta
- Order: Coleoptera
- Suborder: Adephaga
- Family: Dytiscidae
- Genus: Andonectes; Guéorguiev, 1971

Genus of beetles

Andonectes is a genus of beetles in the family Dytiscidae, containing the following species:

- Andonectes aequatorius (Régimbart, 1899)
- Andonectes apure García, 2002
- Andonectes bordoni García, 2002
- Andonectes gregarius García, 2002
- Andonectes intermedius García, 2002
- Andonectes maximus Trémouilles, 2001
- Andonectes meridensis García, 2002
- Andonectes mildredae García, 2002
- Andonectes milla García, 2002
- Andonectes pineiroi García, 2002
- Andonectes septentrionalis García, 2002
- Andonectes similaris García, 2002
- Andonectes trujillo García, 2002
- Andonectes venezuelanus García, 2002
