= Hugh Bosdin Leech =

Canadian-American entomologist

Hugh Bosdin Leech (10 May 1910 – 8 November 1990) was a Canadian-American entomologist who specialized in the systematics of beetles.

Leech was born in Kamloops, British Columbia to parents, Daniel Herbert and Olive Roberta Shephered, who had moved from Manchester, England. His grandfather Sir Bosdin Leech had overseen the construction of the Manchester Ship Canal. Leech was educated at Lakefield and Vernon Preparatory Schools before going to Salmon Arm High School. At a young age he was interested in natural history and was influenced by Ralph Hopping, a forest entomologist. He then obtained a BSc from the University of British Columbia, Vancouver in 1933 and an MSc from the University of California, Berkeley where he studied entomology with E.O. Essig. He married Frances Orchid Quail in 1936. The family moved to California in 1947 joining the department of entomology at the California Academy of Sciences as an assistant curator and became an American citizen in 1955.
