= Leuronectes =

Scientific classification
- Kingdom: Animalia
- Phylum: Arthropoda
- Class: Insecta
- Order: Coleoptera
- Suborder: Adephaga
- Family: Dytiscidae
- Genus: Leuronectes; Sharp, 1882

Genus of beetles

Leuronectes is a former genus of beetles in the family Dytiscidae, now all species are considered part of the genus Platynectes. It contained the following species:

- Leuronectes andinus (Guignot, 1958)
- Leuronectes curtulus Régimbart, 1899
- Leuronectes darlingtoni Guéorguiev, 1971
- Leuronectes gaudichaudii (Laporte, 1835)
- Leuronectes muelleri (Kirsch, 1865)
