= Agametrus =

Scientific classification
- Kingdom: Animalia
- Phylum: Arthropoda
- Class: Insecta
- Order: Coleoptera
- Suborder: Adephaga
- Family: Dytiscidae
- Genus: Agametrus; Sharp, 1882

Genus of beetles

Agametrus is a former genus of beetles in the family Dytiscidae. Now, all species in the genus are part of Platynectes. Agametrus contained the following species:

- Agametrus boliviensis Régimbart, 1899
- Agametrus humilis Sharp, 1882
- Agametrus labratus Sharp, 1882
- Agametrus monticola (Guignot, 1958)
- Agametrus nitens Sharp, 1887
- Agametrus peruvianus (Laporte, 1835)
- Agametrus rotundatus Brinck, 1948
