= Britain I. =

Britain I. is a distribution area defined in the Fauna Europaea database. It comprises the island of Great Britain and all surrounding islands and island groups including Orkney, Shetland, the Outer and Inner Hebrides, Anglesey and the Isles of Scilly. The Isle of Man is also included in the distribution area.

The following territories have their own defined distribution areas and are not included in Britain I.:

- Northern Ireland
- Republic of Ireland
- Channel Islands
